= Ortmayer =

Ortmayer is a surname. Notable people with the surname include:

- Constance Ortmayer (1902–1988), American artist
- Roland Ortmayer (1917–2008), American football player and coach
- Steve Ortmayer (1944–2021), American football player, coach, and executive
- Travis Ortmayer (born 1981), American strongman athlete
