= Jacob Bromwell =

Jacob Bromwell may refer to:

- Jacob H. Bromwell (1848–1924), U.S. Representative from Ohio
- Jacob Bromwell (company), the oldest housewares company in the United States
