= Constance Ortmayer =

American sculptor

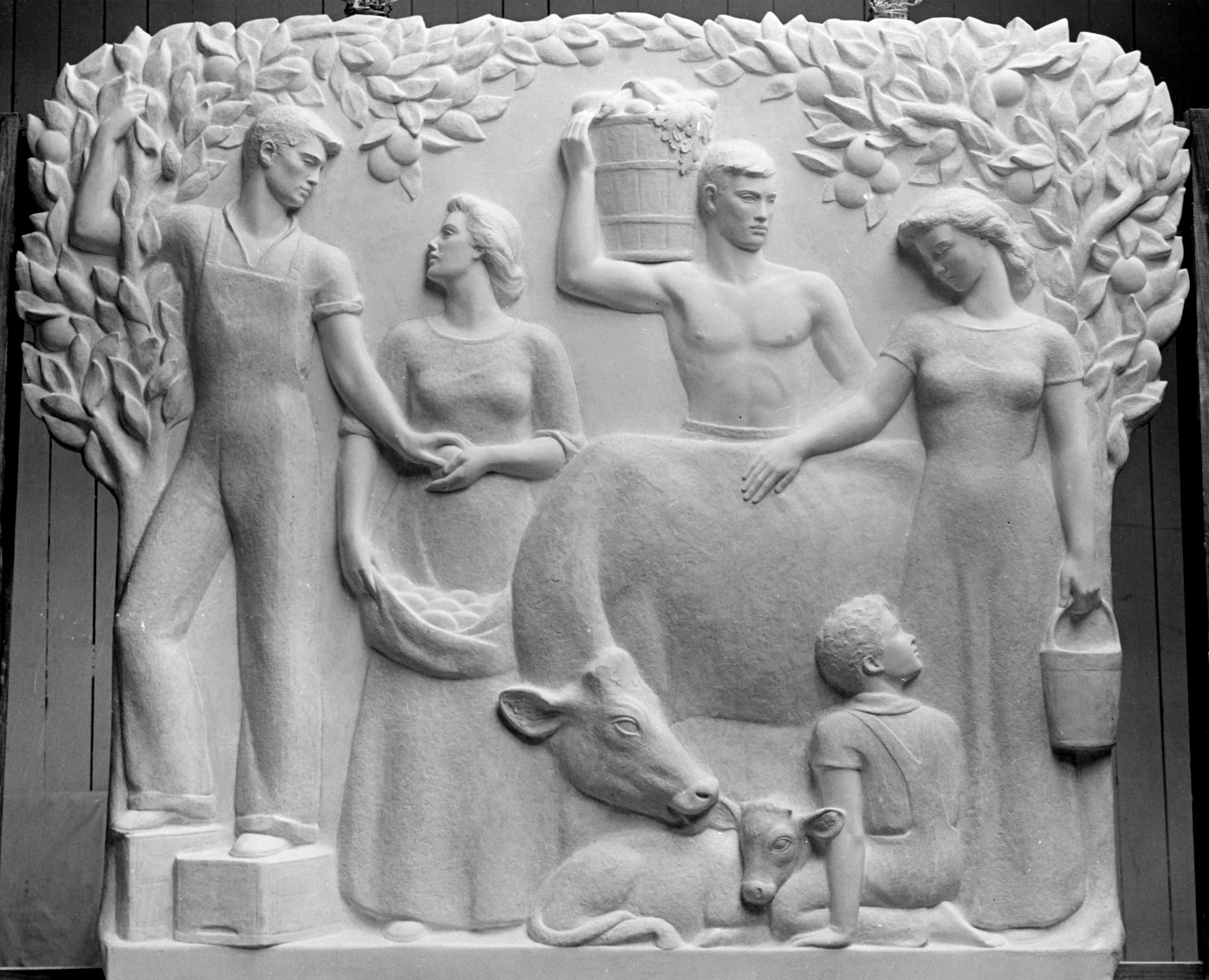
Arcadia (1939), plaster relief at the United States post office in Arcadia, Florida

Constance Ortmayer (July 19, 1902 – May 15, 1988) was an American artist well known for designing the 1936 Cincinnati Musical Center half dollar. Ortmayer was inspired to become an artist by her father, Rudolph Ortmayer, who worked as a lithographer. In 1926, Ortmayer began studying under Austrian born sculptor Franz Plunder. She graduated from the Royal Academy in Vienna, Austria and studied Master School of the Royal Academy. Upon returning to the United States in 1932, Ortmayer found difficulty gaining employment. With the assistance of her friend, a tutor of Treasury secretary Henry Morgenthau Jr. Ortmayer became employed with the Section of Painting and Sculpture, coordinating design contests for federal buildings. In 1937, she ended her employment with the Section. Soon after, she was recruited as a sculpture instructor at Rollins College in Winter Park, Florida, by the current president, Hamilton Holt.

Ortmayer was awarded commissions to design and create two bas reliefs for post offices in Arcadia, Florida, and Scottsboro, Alabama, as a result of her entering a national design competition. The Arcadia relief, completed in 1939, is titled Arcadia. It features five people (two men, a woman and two children) with a cow and her calf. The second relief, completed in 1940, is titled Alabama Agriculture. It features three separate panels, each depicting different stages of crop harvest. In 1941, Ortmayer was promoted to assistant professor of sculpture in 1941. In 1945, she was further promoted to associate professor. She reached the status of professor of sculpture in 1947. During her career at Rollins, Ortmayer created a number of award–winning medals. Ortmayer retired in 1968. She died on May 15, 1988.

== Early life and employment at the Section of Painting and Sculpture ==
Constance Ortmayer was born July 19, 1902, in New York. Her interest in art was inspired by her father, who worked as a lithographer. However, according to an article in the November 15, 1957, edition of the Rollins College Sandspur, Ortmayer became interested in sculpting due to her tutor. In 1926, Ortmayer began studying under Austrian–born sculptor Franz Plunder. Ortmayer spent five years in Europe, graduating from the Royal Academy in Vienna. While in Europe, she also studied under Josef Müllner at the Master School of the Royal Academy. In 1932, Ortmayer returned to the United States. After returning, she found difficulty attaining steady employment. Upon discovering Ortmayer's predicament, her friend, tutor of Secretary of the Treasury Henry Morgenthau and his wife, recommended her for a position in the Section of Painting and Sculpture. Ortmayer secured employment in the Section coordinating design contests that were established to help young artists compete with more well known figures in securing government commissions. In 1937, Ortmayer resigned her position in order to teach at Rollins College because she was interested creating her own sculptures, something she couldn't do during her time at the Section due to time restrictions.

== Time at Rollins College and retirement ==
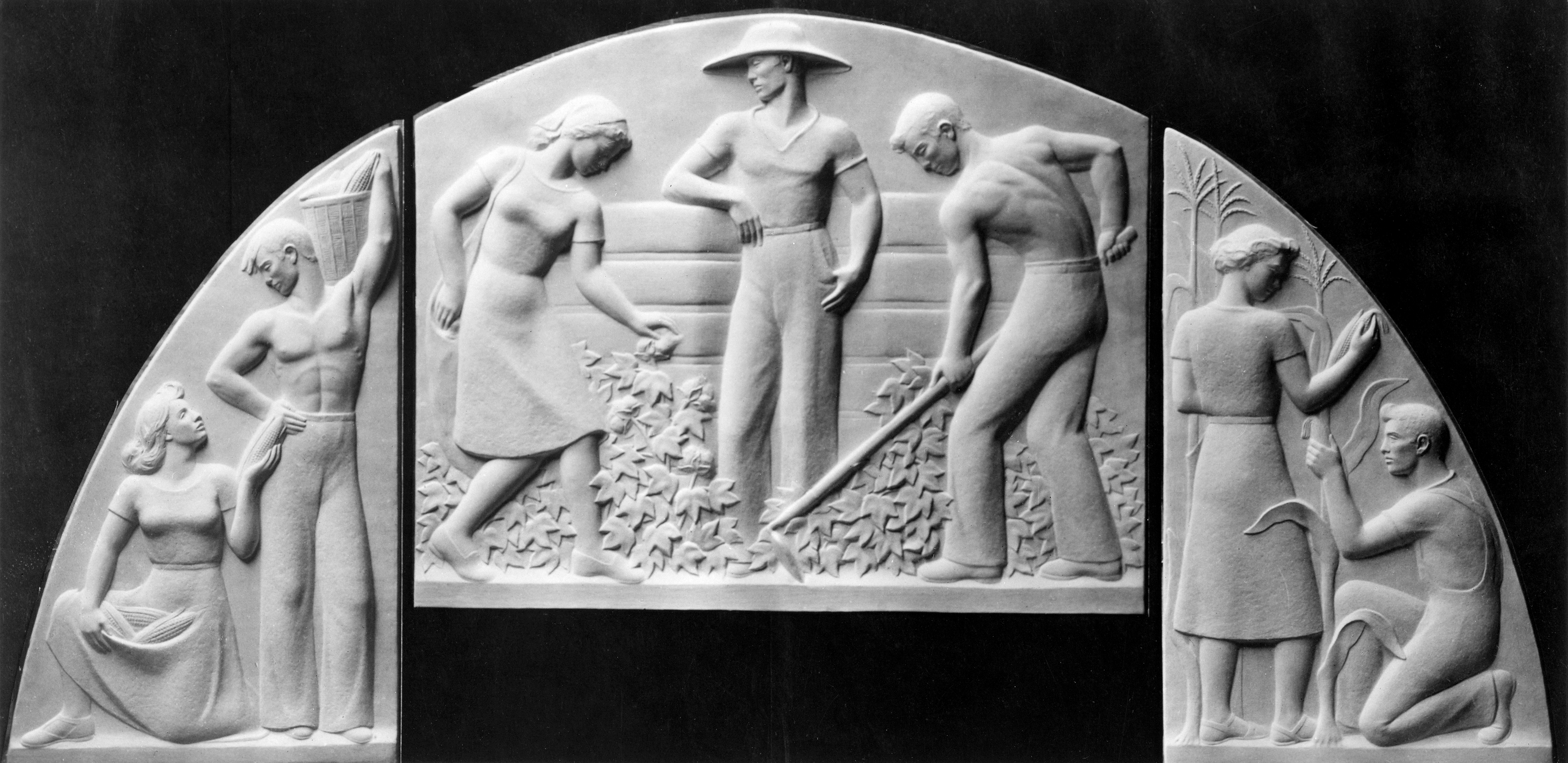
Alabama Agriculture (1940), Ortmayer's three-panel plaster relief at the United States post office in Scottsboro, Alabama

In 1937, Ortmayer was hired as instructor of sculpture at Rollins College by the president of the college, Hamilton Holt. As she was no longer employed by the government, Ortmayer was once again free to submit designs for approval. Ortmayer proceeded to enter a national competition for artists, receiving a runner-up position. As such, she was commissioned to design two bas reliefs for federal post offices; one in Arcadia, Florida, which she completed in 1939, and one for Scottsboro, Alabama, completed in 1940. The relief created for the Arcadia post office depicts a group of three adults (two men, one woman) and two children (a boy and a girl), along with a cow and her calf. The relief is entitled Arcadia The second relief, created for the post office in Scottsboro, is a group of three different panels entitled Alabama Agriculture. The left panel depicts a man and a woman examining ears of corn. The middle and largest panel depicts cotton being harvested. The right panel depicts corn being harvested. In 1941, Ortmayer was promoted from her original position as instructor of sculpture to assistant professor of sculpture. She was once again promoted, this time to associate professor, in 1945. In 1947, she was promoted to professor of sculpture. During her time at Rollins, Ortmayer created a number of medals, most of which depicted then current and former members of the teaching staff at the college. In 1968, Ortmayer resigned from Rollins college. She died, aged 85, having never married.

== Cincinnati Musical Center half dollar ==
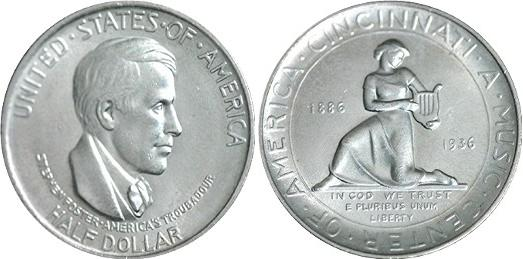
The 1936 Cincinnati Music Center commemorative half dollar

In the mid-1930s, Cincinnati businessman Thomas G. Melish formed a group calling itself the Cincinnati Musical Center Commemorative Coin Association in order to secure the minting of a half dollar commemorating the "50th anniversary of Cincinnati, Ohio as a center of music, and its contributions to the art of music for the past 50 years." The obverse of the coin was to depict Stephen Foster, and the reverse a design emblematic of the goddess of music. The coin was to be dated 1886–1936. Despite the facts that there was no music-related celebration occurring in Cincinnati during that year, that Stephen Foster's connection to Cincinnati was dubious (he had worked for his brother as a bookkeeper for three years in the 1840s), that the year of 1886 did not seem to hold any special relevance to Cincinnati music and that the Cincinnati Musical Center was unknown to any of the established Cincinnati musical groups of the time, the mintage of 15,000 coins was authorized by the act of March 31, 1936. The coins were to be sold at $7.75 per three coin set consisting of one coin from each mint; Philadelphia, Denver and San Francisco. Ortmayer was commissioned to design the coin by the Cincinnati Musical Center. Her obverse design depicts a stylized bust of Stephen Foster, directly below which is the phrase "STEPHEN FOSTER–AMERICA'S TROUBADOUR". Along the periphery of the obverse is "UNITED STATES OF AMERICA" and "HALF DOLLAR". The reverse depicts a kneeling allegorical figure representing music. The figure is holding a lyre. On either side are the anniversary dates of 1886 and 1936. Directly below the figure is "IN GOD WE TRUST" "E PLURIBUS UNUM" and "LIBERTY". Displayed peripherally is "CINCINNATI A MUSIC CENTER OF AMERICA".

== Bibliography ==
- Swiatek, Anthony (1993). Commemorative Coins of the United States. Sidney, OH: Coin World. ISBN 0-944945-13-9.
