= York County, Maine, Tercentenary half dollar =

Commemorative fifty-cent coin struck by the United States Mint

- United States
- Value: 50 cents (0.50 US dollars)
- Mass: 12.5 g
- Diameter: 30.61 mm (1.20 in)
- Thickness: 2.15 mm (0.08 in)
- Edge: Reeded (Note: The edge is ridged, or milled.)
- Composition: 90.0% silver; 10.0% copper
- Silver: 0.36169 troy oz
- Years of minting: 1936
- Mintage: 25,015 including 15 pieces for the Assay Commission
- Mint marks: None, all pieces struck at Philadelphia Mint without mint mark

Obverse
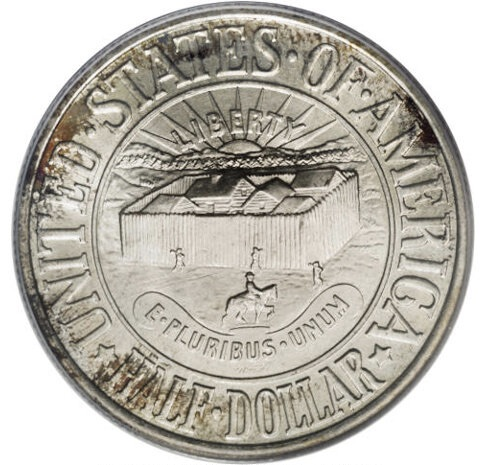
- Design: Brown's Garrison
- Designer: Walter H. Rich
- Design date: 1936

Reverse
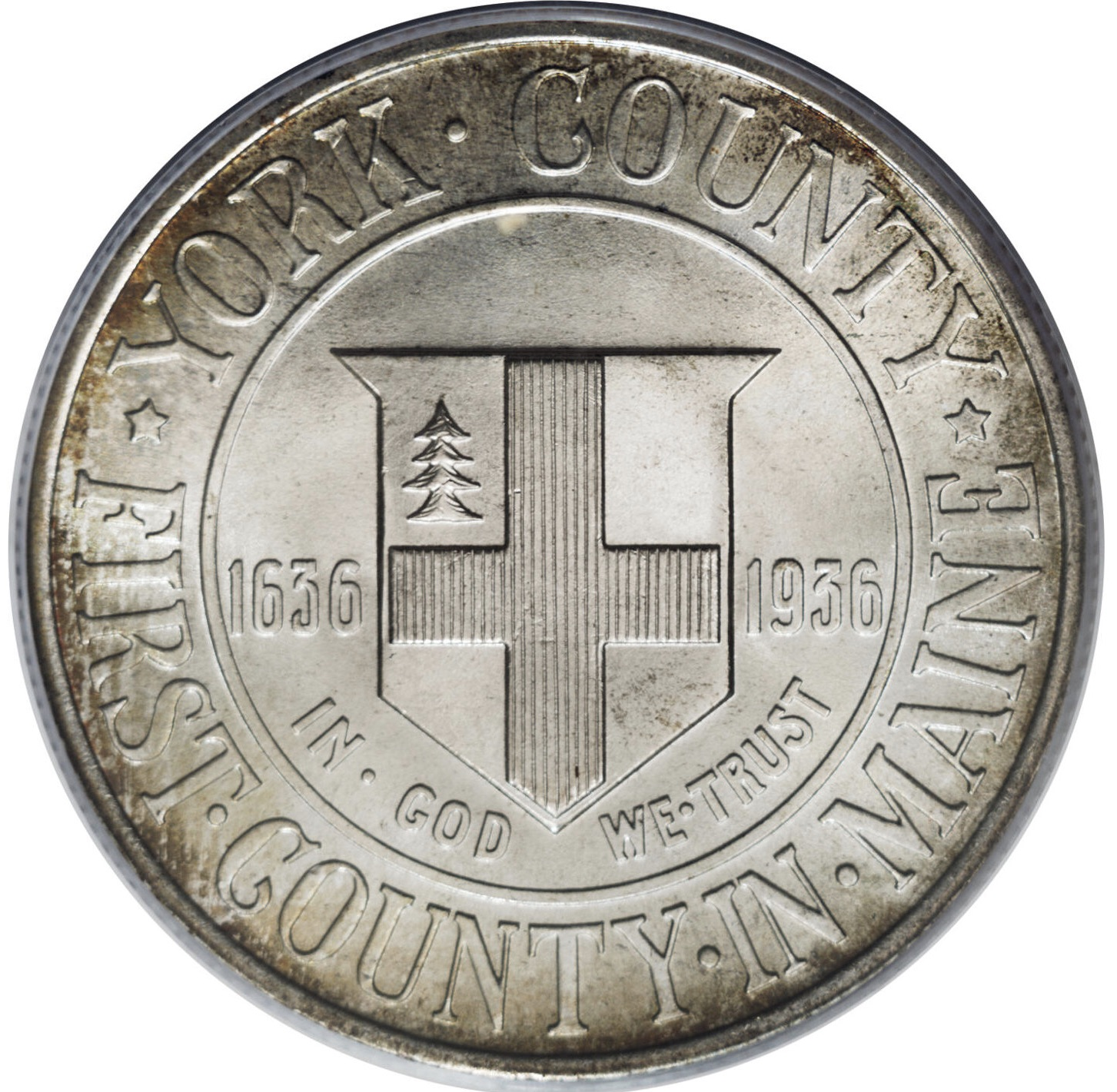
- Design: York County Seal
- Designer: Walter H. Rich
- Design date: 1936

The York County, Maine, Tercentenary half dollar is a 50-cent commemorative coin minted in 1936 to mark the tercentenary (300th anniversary) of the founding of York County, Maine. The obverse shows Brown's Garrison, the fort around which York County was formed, while the reverse depicts the county's arms.

A commemorative coin craze in 1936 saw some coins authorized by the United States Congress that were of mainly local significance; the York County issue was one of these. Legislation permitting the half dollar passed Congress without opposition in the first half of 1936. Maine artist Walter H. Rich designed the issue; his work has garnered mixed praise and dislike from numismatic authors.

The committee in charge of selling the coins to the public asked that the maximum issue of 30,000 coins be struck, but for uncertain reasons, the Philadelphia Mint struck only 25,000 for public sale. Fewer than 19,000 had been sold by 1937, more than half to Mainers; the rest were sold in the 1950s. As of 2020, the York County half dollar catalogs for around $200, depending on condition.

== Background and inception ==
The first European settlement in what is now Maine was at Saco in 1631, where the fortification known as Brown's Garrison was built. In 1636, York County was formed, the first and southernmost county in Maine and one of the oldest political units in the United States.

Sparked by low-mintage issues which appreciated in value, the market for United States commemorative coins spiked in 1936. Until 1954, the entire mintage of such issues was sold at face value by the government to a group authorized by Congress, who then tried to sell the coins at a profit to the public. The new pieces then entered the secondary market, and in early 1936 all earlier commemoratives sold at a premium to their issue prices. The apparently easy profits to be made by purchasing and holding commemoratives attracted many to numismatics, and they sought to purchase the new issues. Congress authorized a large number of commemorative coins in 1936; no fewer than fifteen new issues were struck, each authorized by legislation. At the request of the groups authorized to purchase them, several coins minted in prior years were produced again dated 1936, longest-lived among them the Oregon Trail Memorial half dollar, first struck in 1926.

The York County, Maine, Tercentenary half dollar was one of several early commemoratives issued despite being mostly of local, not national, significance. The commemorative was approved largely due to the connections that many of the coin's sponsors had, including numismatist Walter P. Nichols, who was at the time the Treasurer of the Committee for Commemoration of the Founding of York County. The bill authorizing its minting passed at the height of the speculative market in commemorative coins. Rick Sear, in a 2011 article, wrote, "By 1936, thanks to enabling legislations put forth by accommodating Congressmen, it was possible—or nearly so—to get a coin struck to observe a town picnic ... Although there was no paper trail showing payoffs from local promoters, the fix was in and hardly anyone cared. The national response to and interest in York County's 300th anniversary could generously be described as, 'Huh?'" According to numismatic author Arlie Slabaugh, "of the many bills introduced in Congress for half dollars to commemorate 'local' places or events this is one that managed to pass. Important as York County is to the State of Maine, I regret there is very little that can be said about this commemorative that will have important significance to someone in a distant state." As Anthony Swiatek and Walter Breen put it in their volume on commemorative coins, "aside from the Fort Vancouver issue, this is probably the most obscure local-pride celebration to be honored by a commemorative coin. York County, Maine, is the oldest and southernmost county in the state, but we know of no event of national significance originating there."

== Legislation ==
A bill to authorize a York County half dollar was introduced into the United States Senate on May 8, 1936 by Senator Wallace H. White of Maine. It was referred to the Committee on Banking and Currency. That committee reported back on May 21, 1936, through Alva B. Adams of Colorado. Senator Adams had heard of the commemorative coin abuses of the mid-1930s, with low mintages effectively unavailable to the collector, or issuers increasing the number of coins needed for a complete set by having them issued at different mints with different mint marks; and had held hearings on this on March 11, 1936. Thus, the committee report noted that the original bill had been amended "with the standardized amendments which have been adopted as a legislative policy" by the committee, including requiring an issue of not less than 25,000 coins, and limiting issuance to a single mint, to be selected by the Director of the Mint.

A parallel House bill had been introduced by Simon M. Hamlin of Maine on May 12. That bill garnered a favorable report from the Committee on Coinage, Weights, and Measures, to which it had been referred, and Andrew Somers of New York reported it back to the House on May 29, recommending that the bill pass. That bill was brought to the House floor on June 15, 1936, but unanimous consent was required for its consideration and John Taber of New York objected.

The Senate bill, with the recommended amendments, was passed without debate or dissent on June 1, 1936. The House of Representatives considered the bill, on Somers's motion, on June 20. That day was the final day of the session, and an exceptionally busy day in Congress. A housing and slum clearance bill was pending in the House, but languishing in committee, and Ohio's Stephen M. Young initially objected, stating that the House should be devoting its time to important bills, not proposals for the coinage of half dollars. Somers asked him to withdraw his objection, joined by Bertrand H. Snell of New York, who stated that if Young pressed his objection to this after there being no objection to the many other bills that had been passed, then "I give notice that there will be a lot of other things objected to". Young withdrew his objection, and the bill passed without further debate or dissent. It was enacted into law with the signature of President Franklin D. Roosevelt on June 29, 1936, authorizing 30,000 York County half dollars, of which no less than 25,000 could be issued at any one time.

== Preparation ==
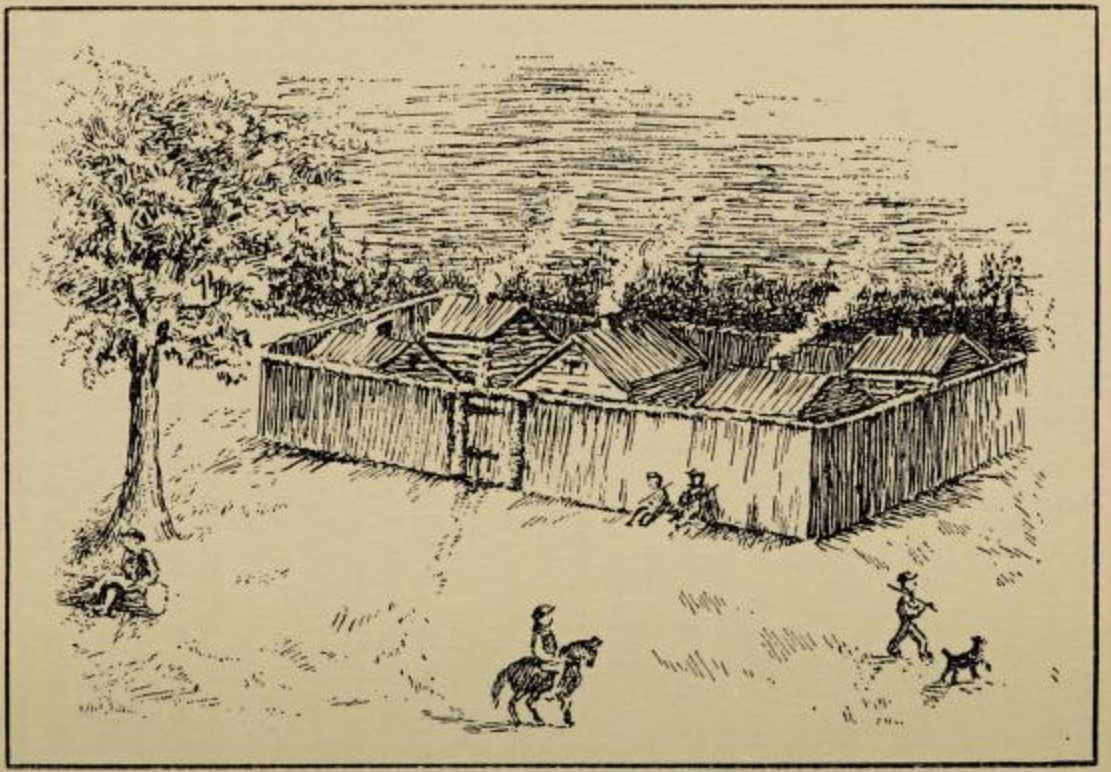
This sketch from The Proprietors of Saco was the basis of the obverse of the York County half dollar.

Little information exists on the preparation of the coinage designs for the York County half dollar. The Committee for the Commemoration of the Founding of York County, in charge of making the arrangements for the half dollar, chose Portland artist Walter H. Rich to create the designs. He based the obverse, which depicts Brown's Garrison, on a sketch published in the book The Proprietors of Saco (1931) by Frank C. Deering, and the reverse on the seal of York County.

Numismatic author Don Taxay suggested that the Commission of Fine Arts (CFA), to whom Rich's designs were submitted, was overworked with the many commemorative coins authorized in 1936, and could devote only scant attention to the York County piece. The commission was charged by a 1921 executive order by President Warren G. Harding with rendering advisory opinions on public artworks, including coins. On July 24, 1936, the CFA's secretary, H.R. Caemmerer, wrote to Assistant Director of the Mint Mary M. O'Reilly that the CFA had met with Rich a week earlier and had approved the designs on condition slight changes to the style of the lettering were made. On August 1, the Boston Advertiser reported that final approval had been made by Treasury Secretary Henry Morgenthau.

The sculpting for the coin's design was done by G. S. Pacetti Company of Boston, in brass rather than the usual plaster, while the dies were reduced from the models by New York City's Medallic Art Company. According to Nichols, this was the first time models had been made in brass for a U.S. coin, and provoked much favorable comment.

== Design ==
As Rich's designs were sculpted in metal rather than the usual plaster, the design has an unusually flat relief more reminiscent of later (late 20th century onward) designs. The obverse depicts the area of the first European settlement in Maine, with Brown's Garrison, the Saco River and four sentries before the fort, with one of them mounted. This made the York County half dollar the third U.S. coin to depict a horse, after the Lafayette dollar (dated 1900) and the Stone Mountain Memorial half dollar (1925). Beyond the fort is the rising sun, and amid the rays is the word LIBERTY; below the fort is seen the motto E PLURIBUS UNUM. Around the design are seen the name of the issuing nation and the coin's denomination.

On the reverse, the presence of a cross in the York County seal makes this half dollar one of only two U.S. coins (with the 1934 Maryland Tercentenary half dollar) to depict a cross as part of the design. The pine tree in the shield's upper left symbolizes the state of Maine. The anniversary dates are to either side of the shield, with IN GOD WE TRUST below it and YORK COUNTY FIRST COUNTY IN MAINE surrounding the shield. W.H.R., the designer's initials, appear incuse near the lower border.

Taxay deemed the York County half dollar inferior to the other commemorative coin approved the same day by President Roosevelt, the San Francisco–Oakland Bay Bridge half dollar. In part, he blamed the "amateurish rendering of Brown's Garrison" used for the obverse, "but the tedious background and oversized border inscriptions are less excusable, even granted that Rich was a wildlife painter and not a professional sculptor."

Coin dealer B. Max Mehl, in his 1937 work on commemoratives, disliked the York County half dollar. "The design reminds me more of a medal than coin and in my humble opinion would hardly win a beauty prize". David Bullowa in 1938 noted that the coin resembled the Fort Vancouver piece, and stated that the York County coin had been criticized as being too plain, though he thought this might have been due to the large inscriptions surrounding the designs. Stuart Mosher, writing in 1940, thought the obverse design was "splendid".

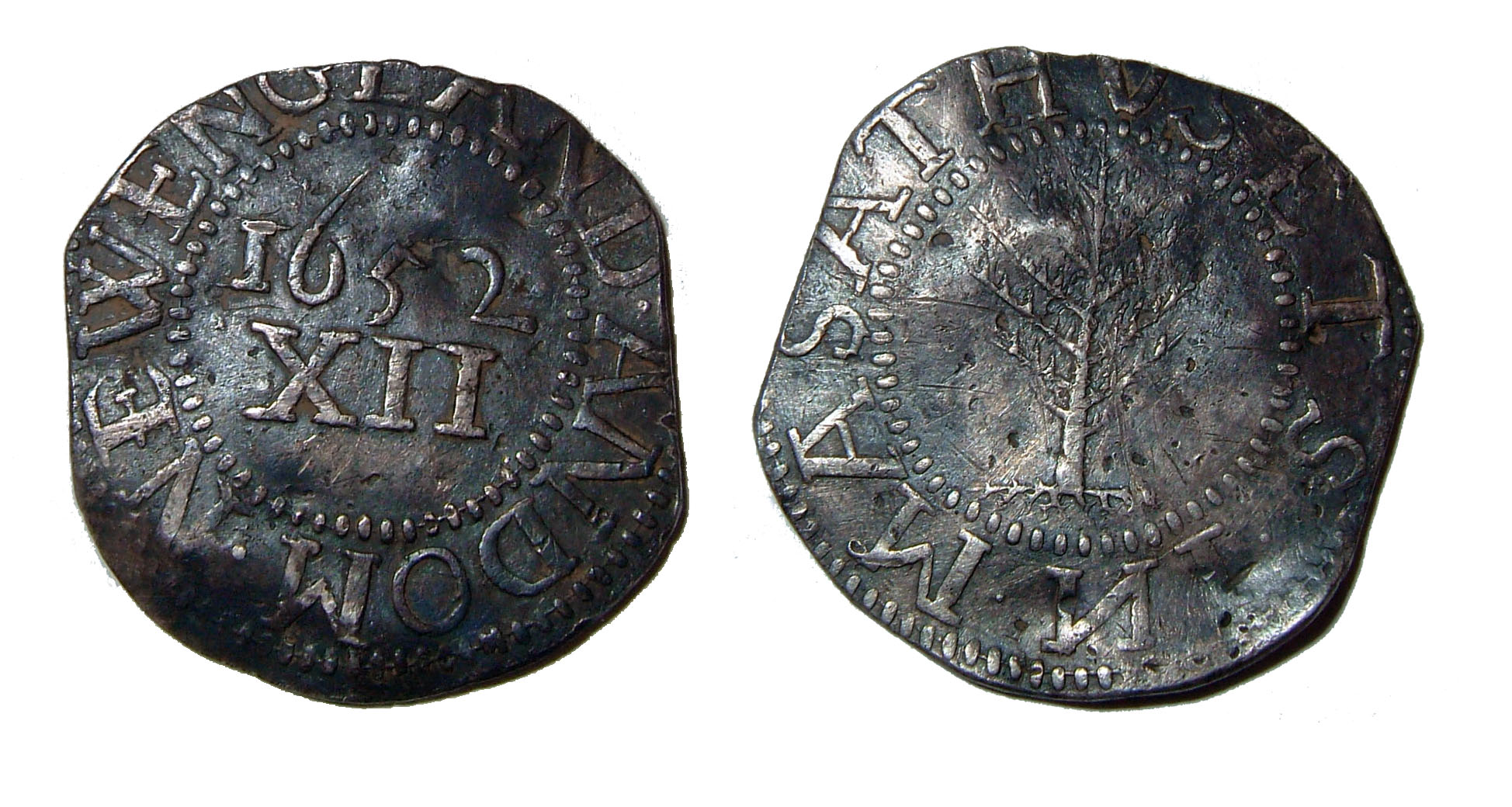
The York County half dollar's broad rims have been compared with those of the pine tree shilling.

William F. Sheehan defended the York County half in an article in the January 1975 issue of The Numismatist. He suggested that the coin, with its broad rims, was meant to evoke the colonial coinage of Massachusetts, of which Maine was long a part, such as the pine tree shilling. "It is said that concerning taste there is no arguing. If beauty is in the eye of the beholder, then those who see in the York County half dollar a harmonious union of motifs from English colonial coinage will see a swan instead of an ugly duckling whenever a York County half crosses their path."

Art historian Cornelius Vermeule, in his volume on U.S. coins and medals, criticized the design of the York County half dollar: "few [coins] have deserved ashes and odium more than this". He deemed the designs "uninteresting to anyone outside the most parochial native antiquarian circles. The old device of the sun's rays fills the background above the buildings, and the placing of the conventional mottoes in the inner borders easily wins a grand prize for unimagination ... The total performance is pedestrian to an extreme. Rather than a design for a coin, it is more like a medallion for a bottle of vintage brandy."

== Release, distributing and collecting ==
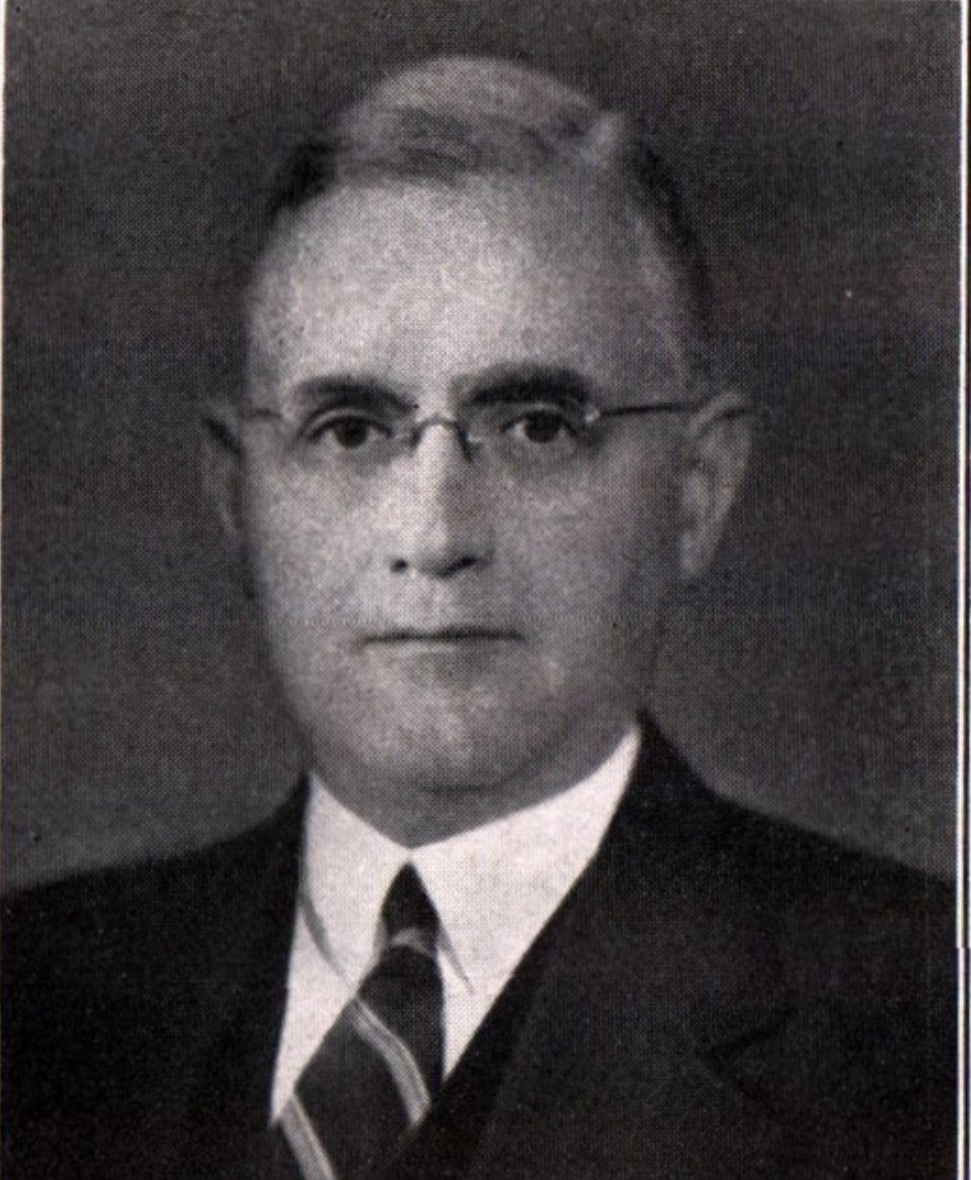
Walter P. Nichols

By letter dated July 21, 1936, the chairman of the Tercentenary Committee, George Wentworth, informed O'Reilly that his committee planned to deposit $15,000 to pay for the authorized mintage of 30,000 half dollars, plus a sum to pay for the Mint's expenses in striking the coins. Despite this, the Philadelphia Mint in early August 1936 struck only 25,000 pieces, plus 15 more held by the Mint to be examined at the 1937 meeting of the annual Assay Commission. Senator White, in a March 15, 1937 letter to Mint Director Nellie Tayloe Ross, stated that the committee had erred, thinking only 25,000 pieces were authorized. He hoped that to support additional fundraising, the remaining 5,000 could be issued, dated 1937, but the Mint refused.

The first 100 coins minted, along with a map that depicted "Olde York County Maine", were mounted in a glass case for presentation. Each was numbered corresponding to the order in which the coin was minted. Distribution of coins to the public was supervised by Nichols on behalf of the York County Commemorative Coin Commission. Ten thousand were put aside for Maine residents. The initial burst of enthusiasm saw the allocation for Mainers oversubscribed, and they were sold coins earmarked for out-of-staters. The price was $1.50 for Mainers and $1.65 (including postage) for those living elsewhere. When sales came to a halt in mid-1937, the Commission still had over 6,000 coins remaining. These were retained by the Commission and offered for sale in the 1950s at $15.50 for ten coins; they quickly sold.

With the exception of the first 100 coins, the commemoratives were sold in folding paper holders that depicted on their front cover black line drawings of Brown's Garrison and the York National Bank of Saco. Also included were slots to hold up to five more coins, as well as a tissue paper insert that read "We thank you for your interest in our commemorative half dollar, and extend to you the hospitality of York County, Maine. York County Commemorative Coin Commission." By 1940 the York piece sold for about $1.25 in uncirculated condition, though this went up to $2.50 by 1950, $10 by 1960, and $325 by 1985. The deluxe edition of R. S. Yeoman's A Guide Book of United States Coins, published in 2020, lists the coin for between $160 and $220, depending on condition. An exceptional specimen sold for $7,475 in 2008. The original coin holder in which up to five York County half dollars were sent to purchasers are worth from $50 to $125, according to Swiatek (writing in 2012) and if accompanied by original insert up to $150, depending on condition.

== Sources ==
- Bowers, Q. David (1992). Commemorative Coins of the United States: A Complete Encyclopedia. Wolfeboro, NH: Bowers and Merena Galleries, Inc. ISBN 978-0-943161-35-8.
- Bullowa, David M. (1938). "The Commemorative Coinage of the United States 1892–1938". Numismatic Notes and Monographs (83). New York: American Numismatic Society: i–192. JSTOR 43607181. (subscription required)
- Flynn, Kevin (2008). The Authoritative Reference on Commemorative Coins 1892–1954. Roswell, GA: Kyle Vick. OCLC 711779330.
- Sheehan, William F. (January 1975). "The ugly duckling from York County". The Numismatist. 88 (1): 19–21.
- Slabaugh, Arlie R. (1975). United States Commemorative Coinage (second ed.). Racine, WI: Whitman Publishing. ISBN 978-0-307-09377-6.
- Swiatek, Anthony (2012). Encyclopedia of the Commemorative Coins of the United States. Chicago: KWS Publishers. ISBN 978-0-9817736-7-4.
- Swiatek, Anthony; Breen, Walter (1981). The Encyclopedia of United States Silver & Gold Commemorative Coins, 1892 to 1954. New York: Arco Publishing. ISBN 978-0-668-04765-4.
- Taxay, Don (1967). An Illustrated History of U.S. Commemorative Coinage. New York: Arco Publishing. ISBN 978-0-668-01536-3.
- United States House of Representatives Committee on Coinage, Weights, and Measures (May 29, 1936). To Authorize the Coinage of 50-cent Pieces in Commemoration of the Founding of York County, Maine. United States Government Printing Office – via Congressional ProQuest.(subscription required)
- United States Senate Committee on Banking and Currency (March 11, 1936). Coinage of commemorative 50-cent pieces. United States Government Printing Office – via Congressional ProQuest.(subscription required)
- United States Senate Committee on Banking and Currency (May 21, 1936). Authorize the Coinage of 50-cent Pieces in Commemoration of the Founding of York County, Maine (PDF) – via Congressional ProQuest. (subscription required)
- Vermeule, Cornelius (1971). Numismatic Art in America. Cambridge, MA: The Belknap Press of Harvard University Press. ISBN 978-0-674-62840-3.
- Yeoman, R. S. (2020). A Guide Book of United States Coins (Mega Red 5th ed.). Atlanta, GA: Whitman Publishing, LLC. ISBN 978-0-7948-4705-0.
