= Cleveland Centennial half dollar =

1936 US commemorative 50-cent coin

- United States
- Value: 50 cents (0.50 US dollars)
- Mass: 12.5 g
- Diameter: 30.61 mm (1.20 in)
- Thickness: 2.15 mm (0.08 in)
- Edge: Reeded
- Composition: 90.0% silver; 10.0% copper
- Silver: 0.36169 troy oz
- Years of minting: 1936–1937, though all are dated 1936
- Mintage: 50,030 including 30 coins for the Assay Commission
- Mint marks: None, all struck at the Philadelphia Mint without mint mark.

Obverse
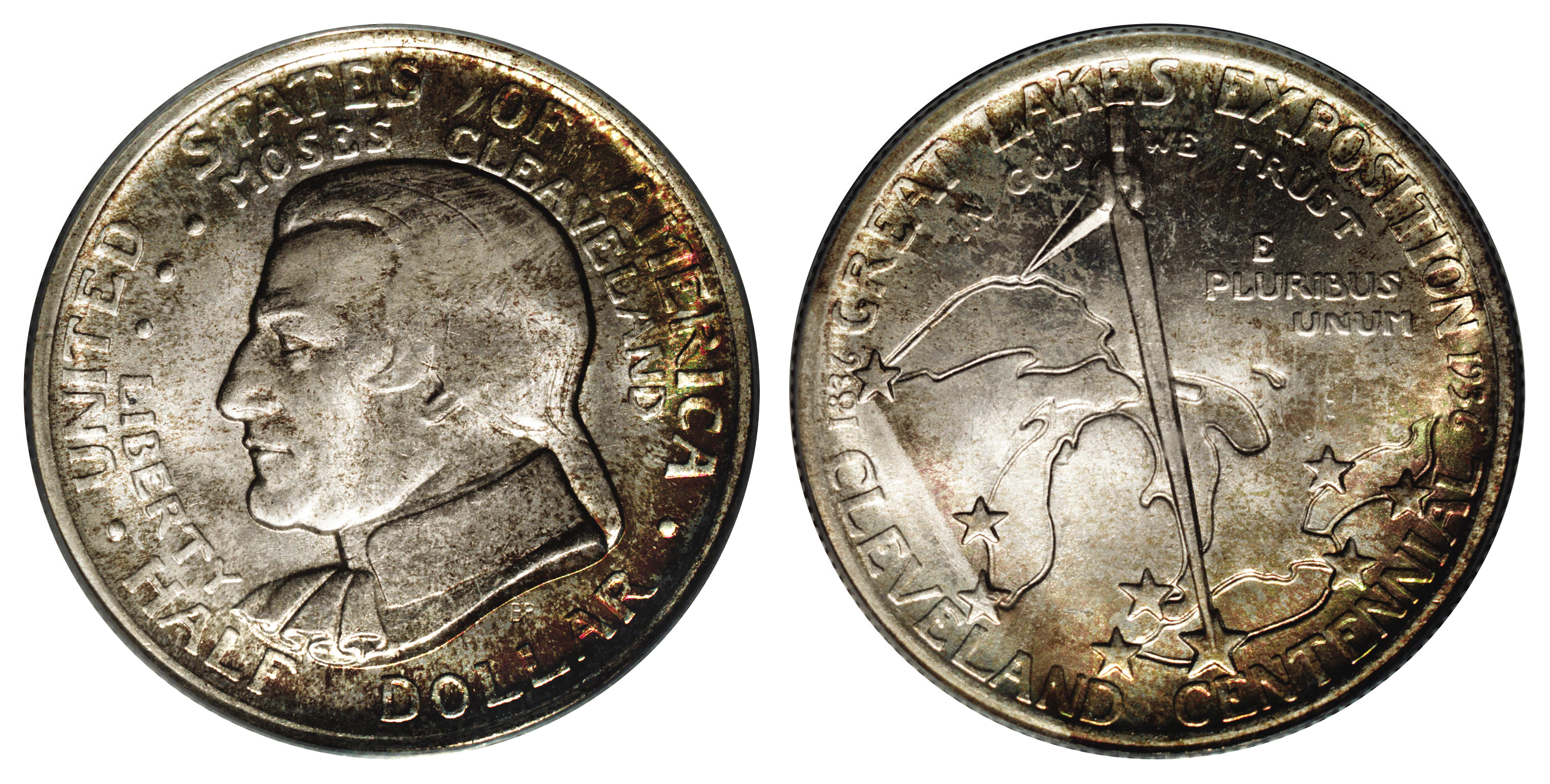
- Design: Portrait of Moses Cleaveland
- Designer: Brenda Putnam
- Design date: 1936

Reverse
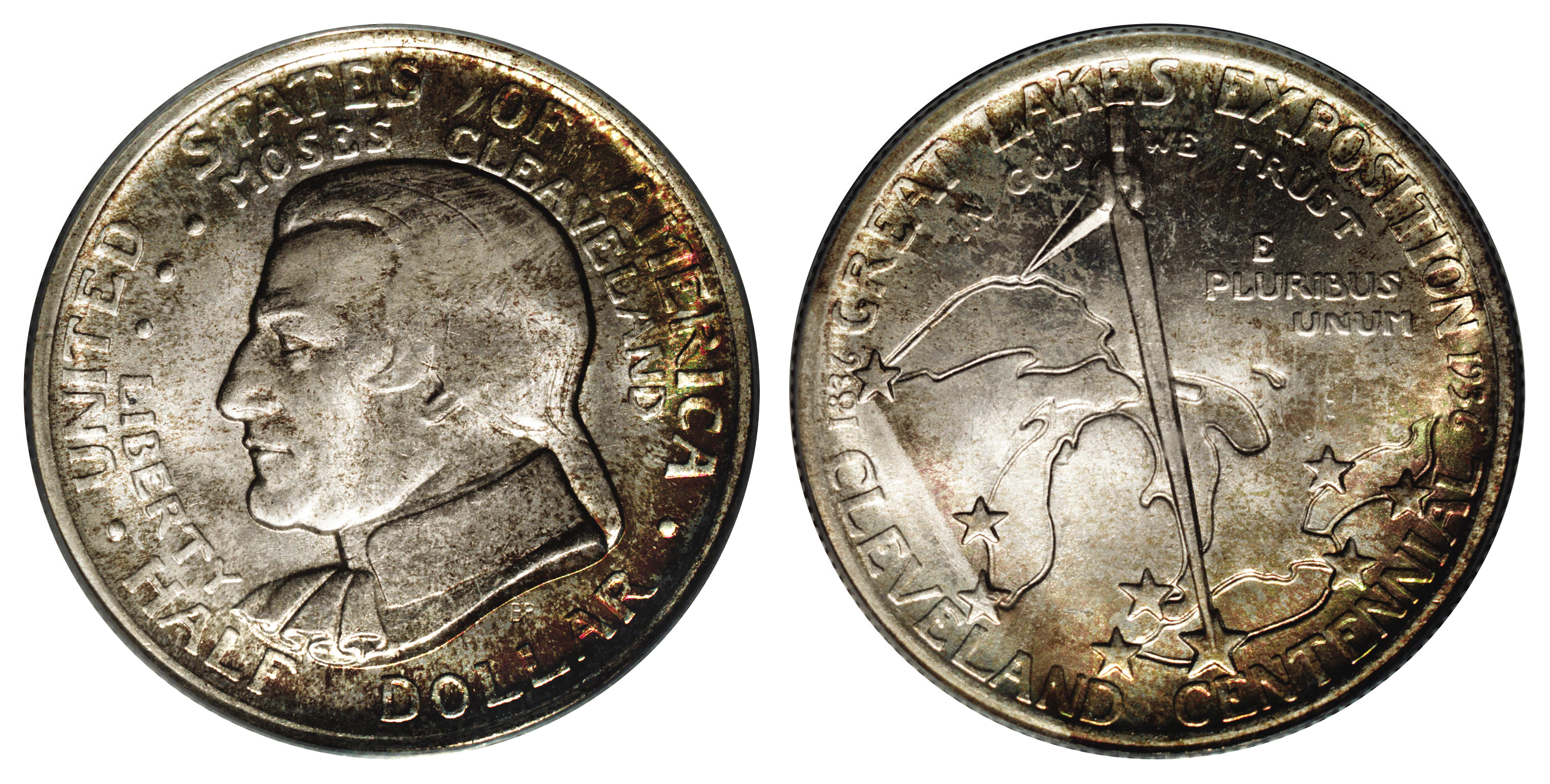
- Design: Map of the Great Lakes with cities marked by stars and with a compass point marking Cleveland
- Designer: Brenda Putnam
- Design date: 1936

The Cleveland Centennial half dollar is a commemorative United States half dollar struck at the Philadelphia Mint in 1936 and 1937, though all bear the earlier date. Sometimes known as the Cleveland Centennial Great Lakes Exposition half dollar, it was issued to mark the 100th anniversary of Cleveland, Ohio, as an incorporated city, and in commemoration of the Great Lakes Exposition, held in Cleveland in 1936.

In the mid-1930s, commemorative coins were increasing in value, and Cincinnati businessman Thomas G. Melish, a coin collector, lobbied Congress to authorize several new issues, of which he would be the sole distributor. He was successful with the Cincinnati Musical Center half dollar, from which he profited greatly, and with the Cleveland piece. Brenda Putnam designed the Cleveland coin, which was approved by the Commission of Fine Arts after suggestions by sculptor Lee Lawrie.

Melish distributed the Cleveland coins through the exposition, at local banks, and by mail order from his office in Cincinnati. Sales were good, and the full authorized mintage of 50,000 was struck. Congress had inserted safeguards in the legislation to curb excessive profits, and though some of the coins were minted in 1937, there was no change of date, meaning collectors would have to purchase only one piece to have a complete set. Thousands remained in dealer inventories for years, and the coins remain inexpensive by the standards of commemorative coins of the era.

== Background ==
After the American Revolutionary War, the area known as the Western Reserve, now in eastern Ohio, was the subject of dispute among the states, several of which claimed it as part of their territory. Although political rights to the area were given up to the federal government, Connecticut kept land ownership and used part of its holdings to resettle those whose homes had been destroyed by the British during the war. The remainder was sold to the Connecticut Land Company in 1795. Moses Cleaveland was a surveyor, a lawyer, and one of the company's directors. In 1796, by the shores of Lake Erie, he set out a townsite that came to bear his name. In 1830, a newspaper was founded, to be called the Cleaveland Advertiser. The editor found the name one character too long to fit in the printing form and dropped the first "a" in Cleaveland — a change that was adopted by the public. The town of Cleveland became a city in 1836.

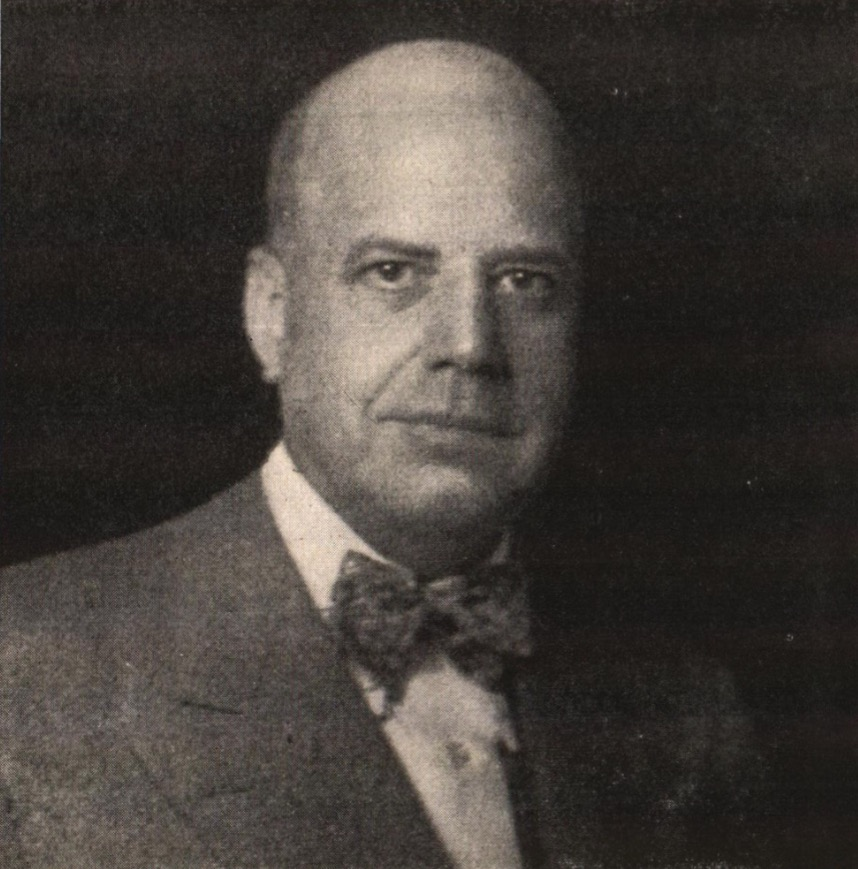
Thomas G. Melish

Thomas G. Melish was a prominent Cincinnati businessman, who had inherited the Bromwell Wire Company. Melish was also a coin collector, who came up with an idea for a commemorative coin that he would control. At the time, commemoratives were not sold by the government — Congress, in authorizing legislation, designated an organization that had the exclusive right to purchase the coins at face value and vend them to the public at a premium. The result was the 1936 Cincinnati Music Center half dollar, an issue controlled by Melish and issued to commemorate an anniversary that did not exist. Melish sold only a few coins at the issue price, which was high, keeping back most for later sale once scarcity drove the price higher. By 1936, the market for U.S. commemorative coins had become, according to Q. David Bowers, "as hot as a volcano", and "Congress gave [Melish] permission to have his own commemorative coins minted and to charge the public whatever he liked for them!" Melish, who had friends in Congress, had in early 1936 also tried to get lawmakers to authorize other commemorative issues that he would control. The only one of these that came to fruition was the Cleveland Centennial half dollar.

== Legislation ==
A bill for a Cleveland Centennial half dollar was introduced into the United States Senate by Ohio's Robert J. Bulkley on March 23, 1936, and it was referred to the Committee on Banking and Currency. The bill was to honor both the 100th anniversary of Cleveland's incorporation as a city, and the Great Lakes Exposition, to be held there in 1936. The original bill would have provided for 50,000 pieces, which could be purchased from the United States Bureau of the Mint at any time, and could be struck by any or all three of the mints then in operation. The bill was reported back to the House by committee chairman Alva B. Adams of Colorado on March 26, drastically amended.

Adams had held hearings on other commemorative coins on March 11, 1936, and had separately been told of the abuses as issuers sought to get collectors to buy their coins. These included getting additional designs authorized (as in the case of the Arkansas Centennial half dollar) and having the coins struck at all three mints. As the law required coins to bear the year of striking, and because mint marks were used on coins produced at some mints, striking them in successive years at multiple mints created more varieties that coin enthusiasts would have to buy to keep their collections complete. The committee heard of the Oregon Trail Memorial half dollar, authorized in 1926 and still being struck in 1936, and of commemorative coins created with intentionally low mintages as a way of inflating profits. When legislation for a Cleveland half dollar came before his committee, Adams struck out the entire bill, after the enacting clause, and substituted a new version. The original legislation had given the Cleveland Centennial Commemorative Coin Committee, controlled by Melish, discretion to have the new piece struck at any of the mints, at any time even over the course of years, in any amount up to the authorized limit of 50,000. Adams's new text kept the total limit but set a minimum of 25,000 that had to be issued. Adams's amendment required that all the coins be of a single design, be struck at a single mint (to be selected by the Director of the Mint). It provided that all the coins be dated 1936 even if struck later and that the Cleveland committee could purchase no less than 5,000 at a time. In a separate report, Senator Adams noted that Bulkley's original bill "contains certain provisions which the committee recommends be eliminated not only from such bill but also from all subsequent bills relating to the issuance of commemorative coins."

The bill, as amended, passed the Senate without a recorded vote on March 27, 1936. The House of Representatives received the bill on April 1 and referred it to the Committee on Coinage, Weights, and Measures. It was reported back to the House on April 16, having been amended to require the Cleveland committee to purchase not less than 25,000 coins at one time, eliminating the possibility that the committee could order an initial 5,000 and then fail to purchase any more. The full House considered the bill on April 23, 1936, with the bill reported by John J. Cochran of Missouri as an emergency measure. When he asked for unanimous consent to pass the amended bill, Pennsylvania's Robert F. Rich asked how many coinage bills were going to be considered and if it would not be possible to consolidate a dozen of them into one bill. Cochran replied that he had consulted with Ohio's Robert Crosser and been informed that "if we do not get the authority to print the coins now it will be useless". The following day, Bulkley moved that the Senate concur in the House amendments, which it did, and the bill was signed into law by President Franklin D. Roosevelt on May 5, 1936.

== Preparation ==
Brenda Putnam, a well-known sculptor, was engaged to design the coin. On May 1, even before Roosevelt signed the legislation, the Director of the Mint, Nellie Tayloe Ross, sent sketches that had been submitted by Putnam to the Commission of Fine Arts. That commission had been charged by President Warren G. Harding's 1921 executive order with rendering advisory opinions on the designs of public artworks, including coins. On May 2, commission chairman Charles Moore responded to Ross, giving preliminary approval, and stating that one of its members would work with Putnam as she prepared the necessary plaster models. That representative was Lee Lawrie, who suggested to Putnam that she use stars to represent the cities of the Great Lakes region. Putnam had placed, on the map on the reverse, sketches of buildings to represent the sites of Chicago, Detroit, Cleveland, Buffalo, and Toronto. When Lawrie wrote to Moore to report this and other progress, Moore joked about the coin having an enlarged star for Cleveland,

At funerals I hear read the Scriptures to the effect that "one star differeth from another in glory". (Note: 1 Corinthians 15:41) So I suppose Miss Putnam's big star for Cleveland refers to the glory rather than the size of the city. Well, as a voter in Detroit (Note: Both Detroit and Chicago were and are larger in population than Cleveland.) I don't mind, and probably no Chicago person will ever see one of the coins. I am convinced that the whole movement is a coin-collector's racket that is going on all over the country.

Putnam's models were approved by the commission on June 2, 1936. The Medallic Art Company of New York reduced the models to half-dollar sized hubs from which coinage dies could be prepared.

== Design ==
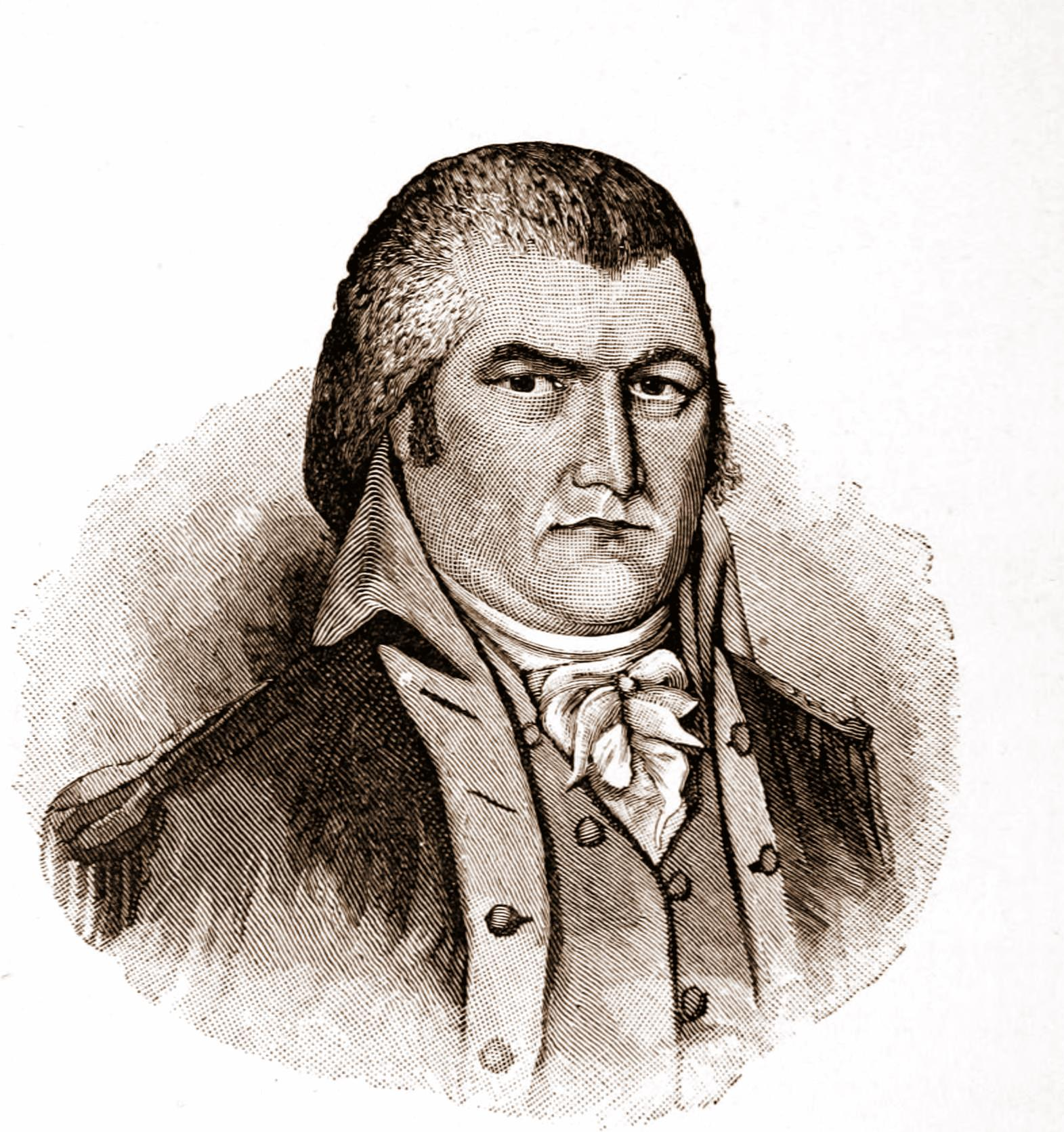
Moses Cleaveland, by an unknown artist

Putnam's obverse features Moses Cleaveland, in a depiction based on the only known portrait of him, by an unknown artist. Surrounding Cleaveland are two lines of inscription, UNITED STATES OF AMERICA * HALF DOLLAR and MOSES CLEAVELAND * LIBERTY. The designer's initials, "BP", are beneath Cleaveland's head. The reverse shows a map of the Great Lakes region with nine stars to represent its cities, listed from west to east: Duluth, Milwaukee, Chicago, Toledo, Detroit, Cleveland, Toronto, Buffalo, and Rochester. Cleveland gets the largest star, which is transfixed by a compass. Anthony Swiatek and Walter Breen, in their book on commemoratives, stated that "we have not found documentation, but we suspect that the compass was intended to show Cleveland as the center of industry within a radius of approximately 900 miles", thus encompassing, the authors suggested, not only the Great Lakes cities represented, but New York, Boston, Washington, and St. Louis. The other inscriptions required by law appear in the upper right of the reverse, and 1836 GREAT LAKES EXPOSITION 1936 CLEVELAND CENTENNIAL surround the map.

Numismatist David Bullowa, in his early work on commemoratives, stated, "the design of this issue is pleasing ... the obverse and reverse alike are sharply defined, interesting and not crowded". Art historian Cornelius Vermeule, in his work on U.S. coins and medals, wrote that the half dollar "manages to combine most of the faults found in the better designs of the 1920s and 1930s." After complaining about the flat design and a large amount of lettering on both sides, Vermeule critiqued, "the bust of Moses Cleaveland can only be described as commonplace, and the view of the Great Lakes, bisected by a large compass, is nothing short of incomprehensible." Nevertheless, Vermeule suggested that Putnam did the best she could to squeeze the required text onto a half dollar, and might have done better with fewer words to place.

== Production, distribution, and collecting ==
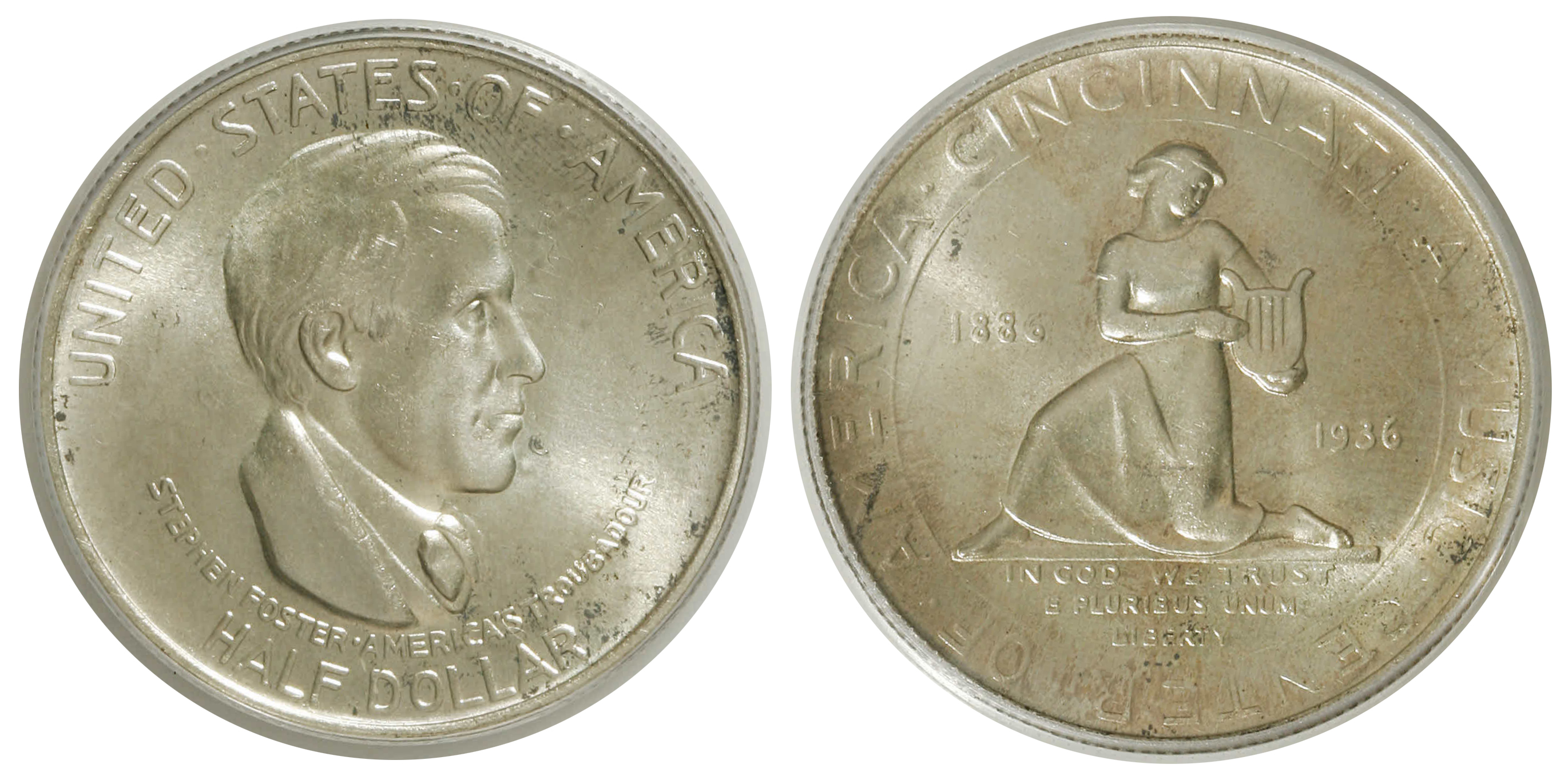
The Cincinnati Musical Center half dollar, Melish's other coin

Melish, in his capacity as treasurer of the Cleveland committee, ordered 25,000 pieces in July 1936. They were shipped from the Philadelphia Mint, where they were struck, on July 20. As well as those pieces, 15 coins were struck and set aside for inspection and testing at the 1937 meeting of the annual Assay Commission. Melish had arranged for the Philadelphia Mint to place the first 201 struck into individually numbered envelopes; these were later placed in special cardboard holders, the first by itself and each two thereafter together, with a notarized statement from Melish.

The Cleveland Centennial and Great Lakes Exposition opened on June 27, 1936, and before it closed on October 4, some four million people passed through its gates. Located on a 150-acre (61 ha) site by the shores of Lake Erie, there were artistic and industrial exhibits, as well as the usual amusements. The half dollars were sold at the fairgrounds, at Ohio banks, and by mail order from Melish's office in Cincinnati. Editor Lee Hewitt commented in the Numismatic Scrapbook, "it seems strange that Mr. Melish, living in Cincinnati, should be the distributor of the Cleveland issue." The Cincinnati Musical Center coin had quickly sold out, the pieces Melish allowed on the market many times oversubscribed, but for the Cleveland piece, "Melish's sales strategy had to be very different; the coins would have to be aimed at the Exposition visitors and the general public at $1.50 each, not at his own coterie of greedy speculators".

Melish sent form letters to collectors warning that his committee had received offers from speculators to buy the entire issue and suggesting they act quickly to get their orders in. By the end of July, Melish wrote that 24,000 pieces had been distributed and that the remaining thousand soon would be. Sales were good enough that in February 1937, Melish ordered the 25,000 pieces which remained from the authorized quantity. In addition to those 25,000 coins, 15 more pieces were struck, intended for the 1938 Assay Commission. Because of the legislation, the new pieces resembled the old exactly, including bearing the date "1936". So many were produced that thousands were hoarded by coin dealers. In 1942, Melish offered 16,000 Cleveland Centennial half dollars to prominent dealer Abe Kosoff for any advance on face value. Kosoff, who would, after Melish's death, auction his coin collection, declined.

In 1941, the Western Reserve Coin Club of Cleveland celebrated its 20th anniversary by countermarking 100 Cleveland Centennial half dollars with a special design. The Secret Service objected, and many were destroyed. The club made similar markings for its 50th and 75th anniversaries, without government interference. The Cleveland Centennial coin is the most common commemorative of the many different designs struck in 1936. R.S. Yeoman's A Guide Book of United States Coins, published in 2020, lists the issue at between $100 and $230, depending on condition. An exceptional specimen sold at auction in 2014 for $4,700.

== Sources ==
- Bowers, Q. David (1992). Commemorative Coins of the United States: A Complete Encyclopedia. Wolfeboro, NH: Bowers and Merena Galleries, Inc. ISBN 978-0-943161-35-8.
- Flynn, Kevin (2008). The Authoritative Reference on Commemorative Coins 1892–1954. Roswell, GA: Kyle Vick. OCLC 711779330.
- Horning, Charles D. (Winter–Spring 1993). "1936 - 34 - $56.47". The Commemorative Trail: The Journal of the Society for U.S. Commemorative Coins (3): 26–33.
- Slabaugh, Arlie R. (1975). United States Commemorative Coinage (second ed.). Racine, WI: Whitman Publishing. ISBN 978-0-307-09377-6.
- Swiatek, Anthony (2012). Encyclopedia of the Commemorative Coins of the United States. Chicago: KWS Publishers. ISBN 978-0-9817736-7-4.
- Swiatek, Anthony; Breen, Walter (1981). The Encyclopedia of United States Silver & Gold Commemorative Coins, 1892 to 1954. New York: Arco Publishing. ISBN 978-0-668-04765-4.
- Taxay, Don (1967). An Illustrated History of U.S. Commemorative Coinage. New York: Arco Publishing. ISBN 978-0-668-01536-3.
- United States Senate Committee on Banking and Currency (March 11, 1936). Coinage of Commemorative 50-Cent Pieces. United States Government Printing Office. (subscription required)
- Vermeule, Cornelius (1971). Numismatic Art in America. Cambridge, MA: The Belknap Press of Harvard University Press. ISBN 978-0-674-62840-3.
- Yeoman, R.S. (2015). A Guide Book of United States Coins (1st Deluxe ed.). Atlanta, GA: Whitman Publishing. ISBN 978-0-7948-4307-6.
- Yeoman, R. S. (2020). A Guide Book of United States Coins (Mega Red 5th ed.). Atlanta, GA: Whitman Publishing, LLC. ISBN 978-0-7948-4705-0.
