= Cincinnati Musical Center half dollar =

US commemorative 50-cent piece

- United States
- Value: 50 cents (0.50 US dollars)
- Mass: 12.5 g
- Diameter: 30.61 mm (1.20 in)
- Thickness: 2.15 mm (0.08 in)
- Edge: Reeded
- Composition: 90.0% silver; 10.0% copper
- Silver: 0.36169 troy oz
- Years of minting: 1936
- Mint marks: D, S. Found immediately below the date "1936" on the reverse. Philadelphia Mint specimens struck without mint mark.

Obverse
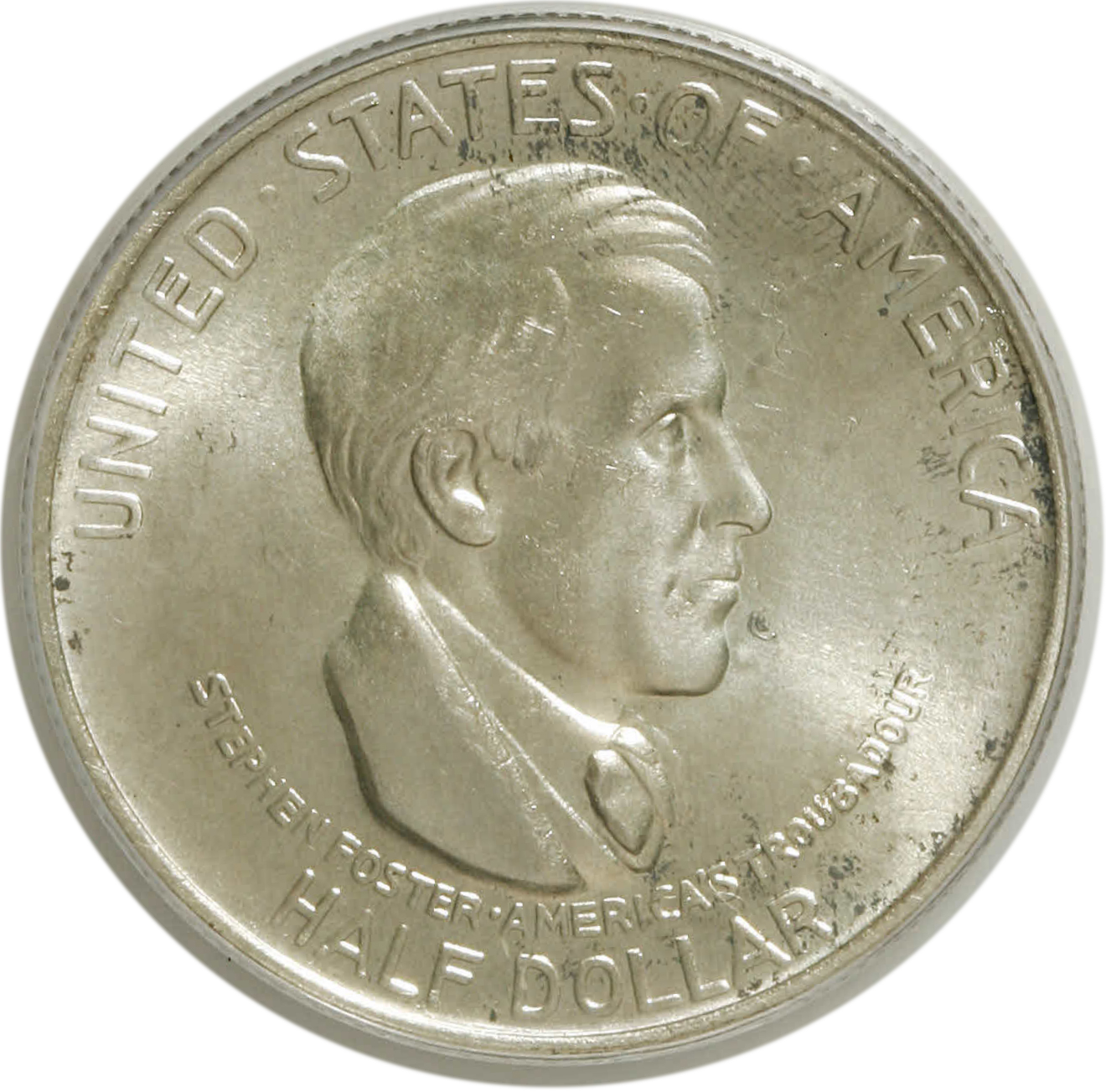
- Design: Bust of Stephen Foster
- Designer: Constance Ortmayer
- Design date: 1936

Reverse
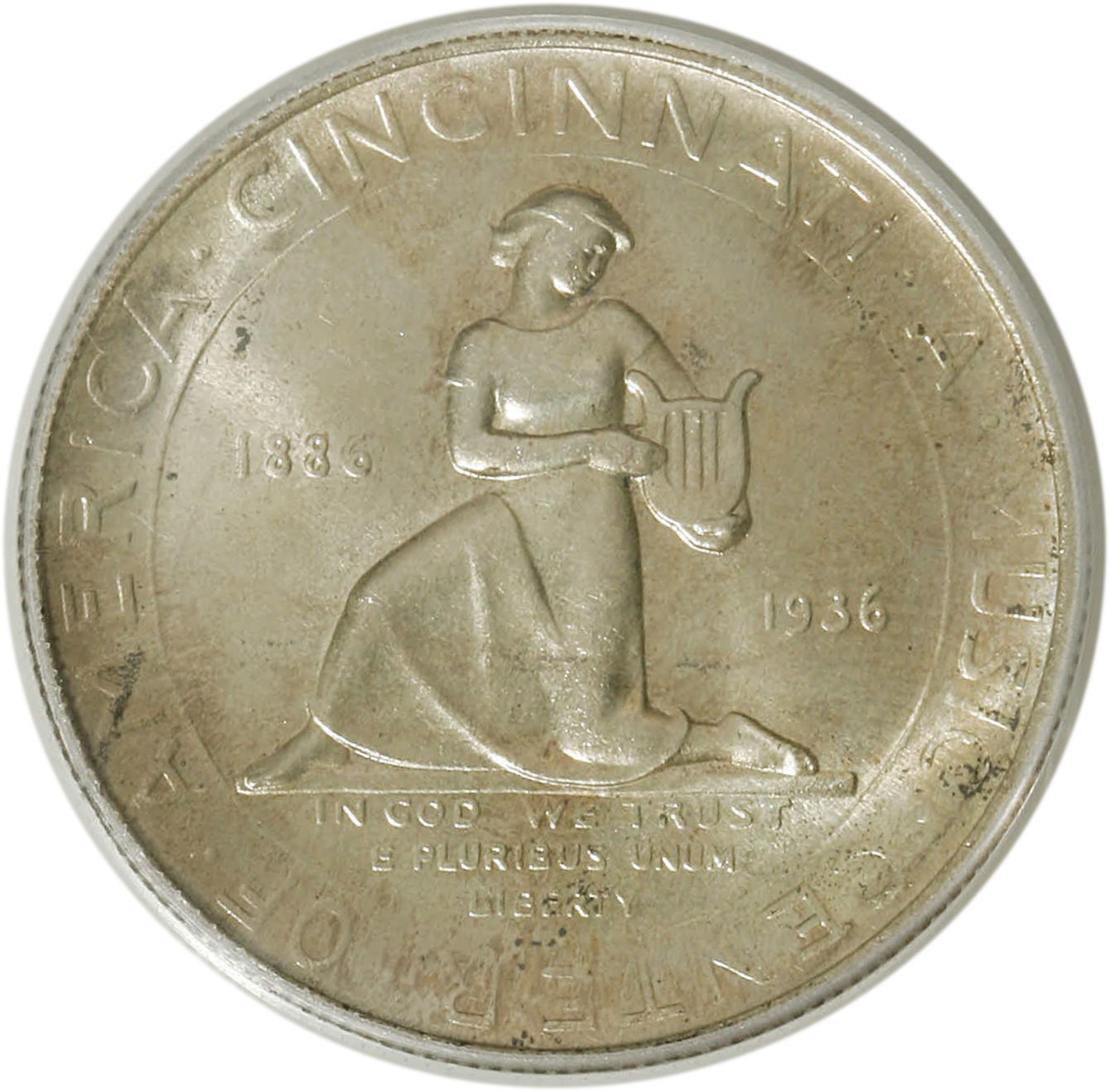
- Design: Allegorical figure with lyre
- Designer: Constance Ortmayer
- Design date: 1936

The Cincinnati Musical Center half dollar or Cincinnati Music Center half dollar is a commemorative 50-cent piece struck by the United States Bureau of the Mint in 1936. Produced with the stated purpose of commemorating the fiftieth anniversary of Cincinnati, Ohio, as a center of music, it was conceived by Thomas G. Melish, a coin enthusiast who controlled the group which was allowed to buy the entire issue from the government, and who resold the pieces at high prices.

Congress approved legislation for the coin on March 31, 1936, authorizing 15,000 pieces to be struck at the three mints then in operation. Melish had hired sculptor Constance Ortmayer to design the coin, but the Commission of Fine Arts refused to recommend the designs. Members objected to the depiction of Stephen Foster on the obverse, finding no connection between Foster, who died in 1864, and the supposed anniversary. Nevertheless, the designs were approved by the Bureau of the Mint, and 5,000 sets from the three mints were issued and sold to Melish's group, the only authorized purchaser.

Melish likely held back much of the issue for later resale, and with few pieces available, prices for the set spiked, rising to over five times the issue price. The value dropped somewhat when the boom in commemorative coins burst in late 1936, but quickly recovered and the coins are valuable today. Melish has been assailed by numismatic writers for greed.

== Inception ==
Sparked by low-mintage issues which appreciated in value, the market for United States commemorative coins spiked in 1936. Until 1954, the entire mintage of such issues was sold by the government at face value to a group authorized by Congress, who then tried to sell the coins at a profit to the public. The new pieces then came on to the secondary market, and in early 1936 all earlier commemoratives sold at a premium to their issue prices. The apparent easy profits to be made by purchasing and holding commemoratives attracted many to the coin collecting hobby, where they sought to purchase the new issues. Among the pieces which had recently been struck and had appreciated in value was the 1935 Old Spanish Trail half dollar. This piece had been issued at the behest of L. W. Hoffecker, a Texas entrepreneur and coin dealer, who put aside a fifth of the 10,000 mintage for himself and sold them well into the 1940s, by which time he had served as president of the American Numismatic Association (ANA). Congress authorized an explosion of commemorative coins in 1936; no fewer than fifteen were issued for the first time. At the request of the groups authorized to purchase them, several coins minted in prior years were produced again, dated 1936, senior among them the Oregon Trail Memorial half dollar, first struck in 1926.

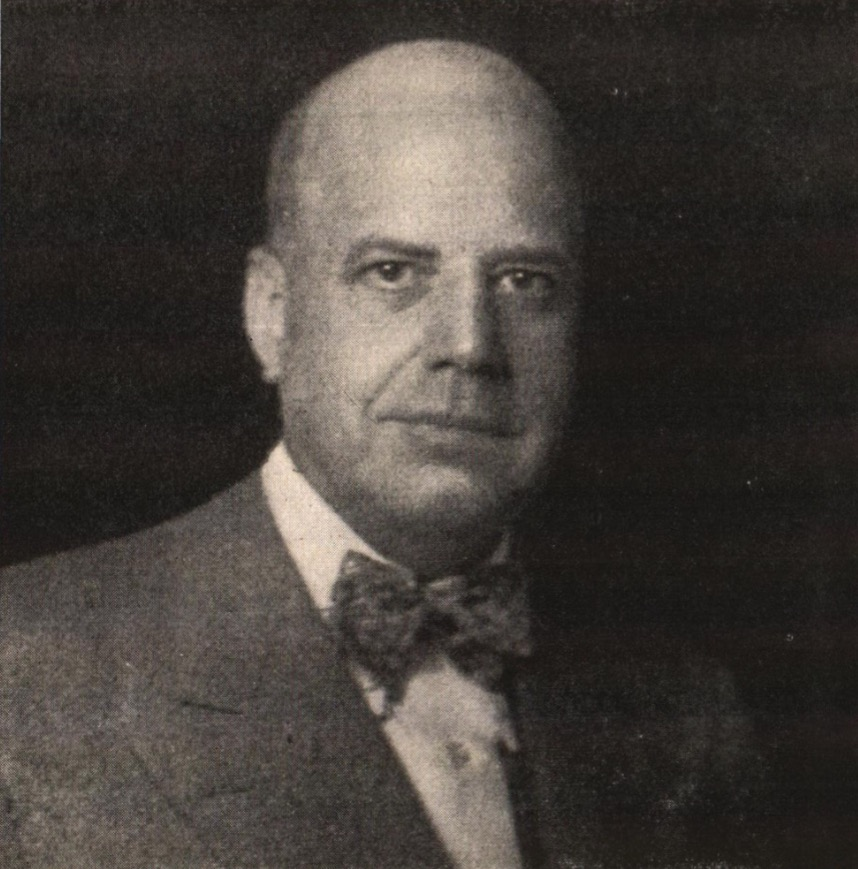
Thomas G. Melish

Thomas G. Melish, a coin collector and entrepreneur from Cincinnati, came up with an idea for a commemorative coin that he would control and from which he could profit. Melish was a prominent businessman who had inherited the Bromwell Wire Company. He formed the Cincinnati Musical Center Commemorative Coin Association, and secured the introduction of H.R. 10264 on January 31, 1936. This bill would have provided for 10,000 coins from the Philadelphia Mint, 2,000 coins from Denver, and 3,000 from the San Francisco Mint. Such a low mintage would have made the Denver coin a significant rarity, increasing Melish's profit. On February 17, the House Committee on Coinage, Weights and Measures recommended that it be amended to provide for a total of 15,000 coins without dictating at what mint or mints they should be struck. That committee, in its report accompanying the bill, noted that the piece was "in commemoration of the fiftieth (golden) anniversary of Cincinnati, Ohio, as a center of music, and its contribution of the annual (Note: Biennial for much of its history) May festival to the art of music for the past 50 years." Melish, through political influence, was able to retain the provision that they should be struck "at the mints", allowing coinage at all three mints. This marked the last time that a coinage bill would pass Congress in the 1930s with that phrasing—later issues were limited to a single mint.

The bill passed Congress, and was signed by President Franklin Roosevelt on March 31, 1936. The pieces were to honor "the 50th anniversary of Cincinnati, Ohio, as a center of music, and its contribution to the art of music for the past 50 years". Anthony Swiatek and Walter Breen, in their volume on commemorative coins, concluded that "pressure from the above-named Association on Congress induced passage of the Act".

== Preparation and controversy ==
Melish engaged Constance Ortmayer to design the coin. Ortmayer later remembered, "I was recommended by them, someone came through Cincinnati ... they were just looking for somebody so they recommended me". Ortmayer apparently prepared a design before the bill passed Congress, for Melish wrote to Assistant Director of the Mint Mary Margaret O'Reilly on April 4, 1936, that the original "lacked distinction and artistic merit" and that Ortmayer would redesign the coin. He wrote again on May 7, asking if Ortmayer's new design was satisfactory. The models were submitted to the Commission of Fine Arts, charged since 1921 with advising on coin design, though the government was not bound to follow its recommendations. On May 13, the chairman, Charles Moore, wrote to Mint Director Nellie Tayloe Ross, withholding approval.

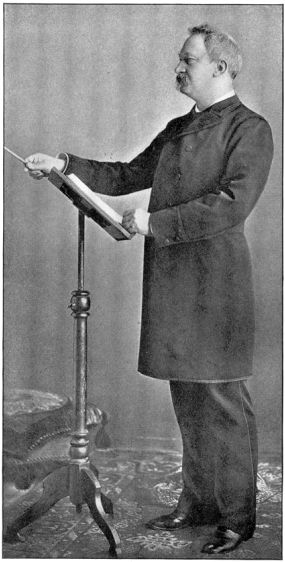
Theodore Thomas

Moore recited the stated purpose of the coin, to commemorate the 50th anniversary of Cincinnati as a center of music, then noted that the obverse depicted Stephen Foster, the composer and songwriter—who died in 1864, whereas Cincinnati was not notable as a center of music until at least 1873. "The Commission is at a loss to connect a fiftieth anniversary in 1936 with a movement that began in 1873." Foster did live in Cincinnati, Moore admitted, but only for a brief period while working as a bookkeeper, and his main contributions to American music came later, when he lived in Pittsburgh and in New York City. Further, the coin was to commemorate Cincinnati's contributions to the art of music, and Foster "was an American troubadour, but to music as an art he made no contribution". Moore felt that if anyone should be depicted, it should be Theodore Thomas, who conducted the Cincinnati May Festival from its beginning in 1873 and in 1878 became director of the Cincinnati College of Music. He stated that "Theodore Thomas was, artistically, the founder of Cincinnati as a musical center. His portrait should appear on any coin commemorative of Cincinnati 'as a center of music'".

On May 16, The Cincinnati Enquirer reported that Thomas would appear on the coin, not Foster. The paper also reported the controversy before the Commission of Fine Arts, that Melish had travelled to Washington the previous day, and had announced he had no objection to the change. Also on May 16, Melish telephoned Lee Lawrie, sculptor member of the Commission. Melish's notes indicate that Moore's objection was on behalf of Alice Roosevelt Longworth and the Longworth family, who had employed Thomas to lead the May Festival, and who wanted Thomas on the coin, although, as (per Melish) Lawrie put it, "Thomas looks like a walrus and would be a very hard head to make". Melish was defiant, stating that he also knew Alice Longworth well, and Foster remained on the coin. Ortmayer remembered that the "boss" of the Bureau of the Mint (presumably Ross) objected to the reverse design, not liking the position of the goddess' legs. Swiatek, in his later volume, averred that Melish's association put pressure on the Department of the Treasury to approve Ortmayer's design.

The Philadelphia Mint received the models from Ortmayer. On May 23 its superintendent, Edwin Dressel, sent O'Reilly a memorandum from Chief Engraver John R. Sinnock, stating that the sculptor's models were in too high relief, and suggesting that Ortmayer come to the mint to discuss the matter. A letter from O'Reilly to Melish on June 18 reports that after some modification, Sinnock wrote that the coin was at the very limit of high relief that the mint could coin, and that dies for the Cincinnati piece were expected to be tested by coining trial strikes in early July.

== Design ==
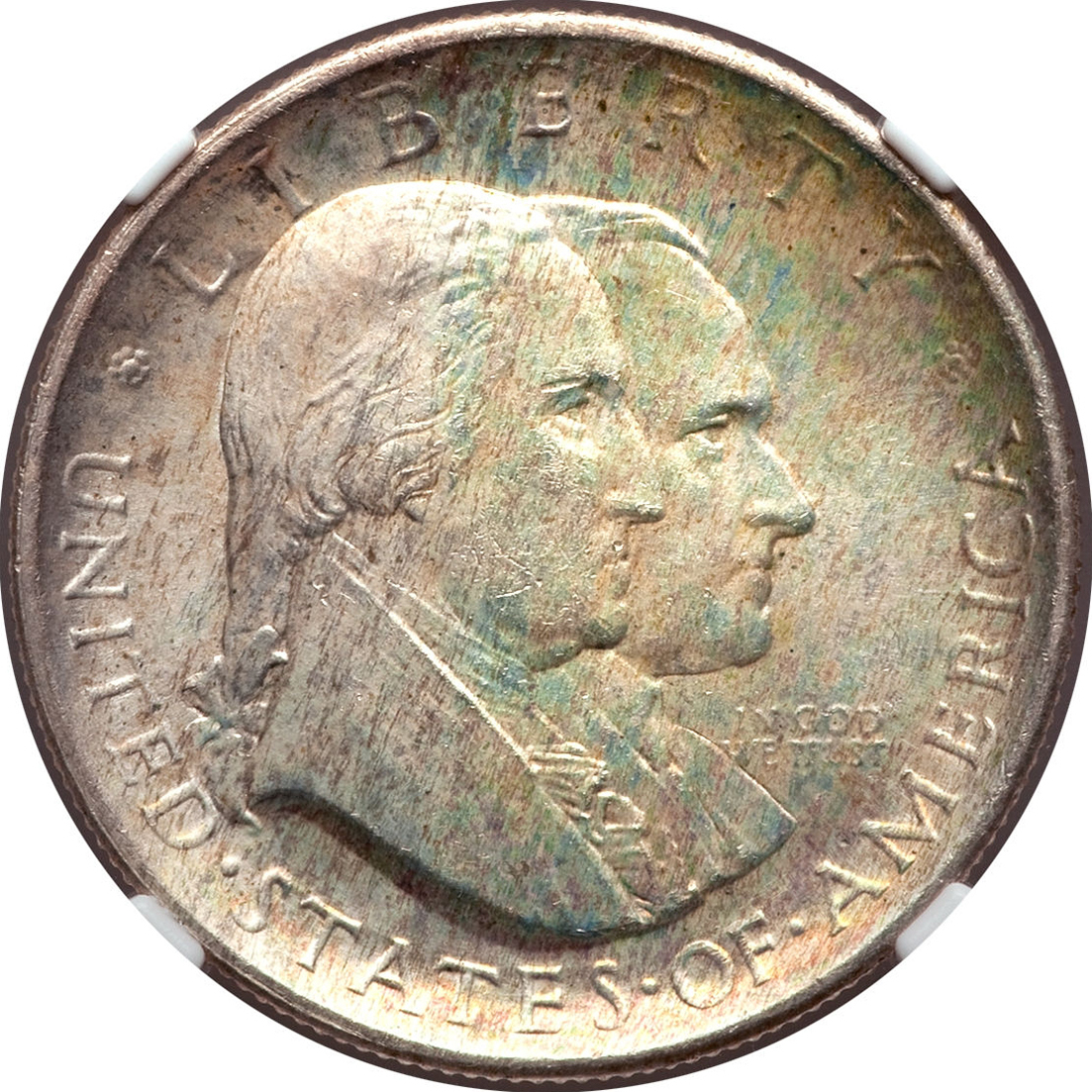
Cornelius Vermeule compared the Cincinnati coin with the Sesquicentennial half dollar.

The obverse of the Cincinnati Musical Center half dollar displays a bust of Stephen Foster, facing to the viewer's right, and below it, the words "STEPHEN FOSTER AMERICA'S TROUBADOUR". This phrase was taken from a biography of Foster published earlier in the 1930s. The artist's initials, "CO", are to the left of Foster. The name of the country, and the denomination, appear near the rim. The reverse shows a kneeling figure, intended to be the goddess of music. In the upper left portion of the field, or background, is the date 1886, in the lower right 1936, and beneath the latter the mint mark (unless struck at Philadelphia, which did not then use one). The goddess kneels on the mottos required by law to appear, and near the edge is "CINCINNATI A MUSIC CENTER OF AMERICA".

The design attracted comments from those interested in coins. Frank Duffield, editor of the ANA's journal The Numismatist, noted in the October 1936 issue that the coin had been awaited with anticipation by hobbyists because of an announcement that it would bear the likeness of Foster, but "when it finally appeared many expressions of approval of the designs were heard and a few criticisms ... Foster deserved a better bust than the one the artist has given us ...the toy four-string lyre [the goddess] holds in her hand is not in keeping with the times or the occasion ... After all these years, Music deserved something better." Coin dealer B. Max Mehl, in his monograph on commemorative coins published in 1937, agreed with the criticism of the reverse, "apparently this lyre must have been bought at a 5¢ and 10¢ store as it seems to be only a toy".

Art historian Cornelius Vermeule, in his 1971 volume on American coins and medals, Numismatic Art in America, criticized Ortmayer's design:

The details and style of this coin perpetuate the slender lettering and weak surfaces of the John Sinnock school, as exemplified in the Philadelphia Sesquicentennial half dollar of 1926. Surfaces are glazed or rubbed over, and the coin has a worn look ... Stephen Foster's bust on the obverse is a distorted or compressed lump, and the "goddess of music" has much the same appeal of a dancer with cramps.

== Release, distribution, and collecting ==
The mintage of 15,000 was struck in July 1936. At the Philadelphia and Denver mints, 5,005 pieces were produced, and 5,006 at San Francisco, with the excess from the even thousands held for inspection and testing at the 1937 meeting of the United States Assay Commission. The first 200 pieces from each mint were collected in sets of three, with a notarized letter from Melish testifying to what number coins they were. Several of these special sets were sent by Melish to government officials.

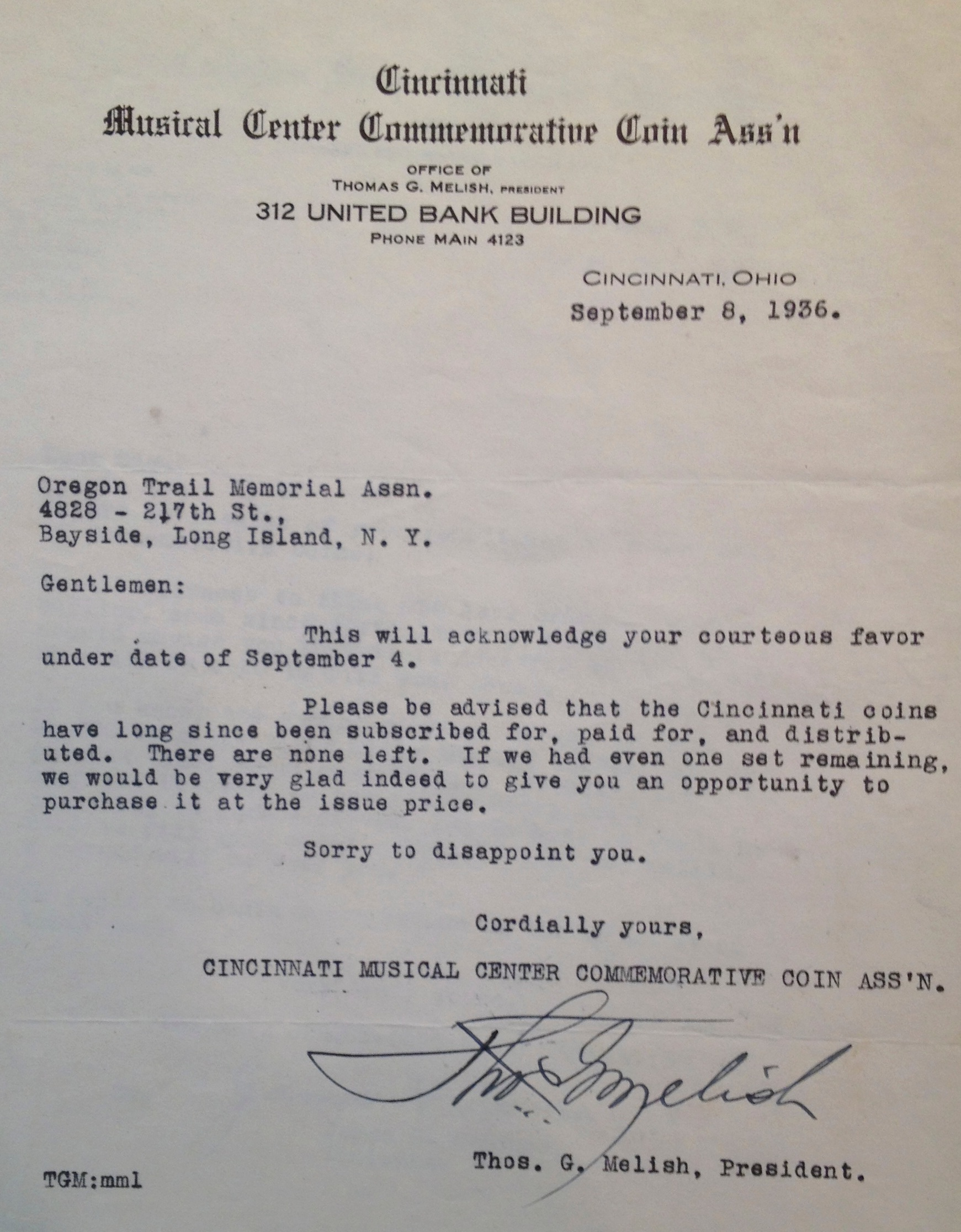
Letter from Melish to a would-be purchaser of the half dollar

Melish had been fielding inquiries from collectors since Roosevelt signed the legislation, but from mid-May, those who wrote received only postcards stating the new issue was oversubscribed. The summer of 1936 was the peak of the commemorative coin boom, and Melish announced the new pieces would be sold in sets of three by mint mark for $7.75 (a high price at that time). Order blanks were sent to those who had written early, and soon these blanks were selling for $10. Yet few collectors were successful in having their orders filled, with most having their payment returned as the coins had supposedly sold out. The sets quickly jumped in price to $40. At this high level, many coins proved available. Numismatist Q. David Bowers stated that these were most likely surreptitiously sold by Melish and other insiders. Melish also allowed the issuers of the York County, Maine, Tercentenary half dollar to purchase, at the original issue price, several sets—members of the public could order at most one set at that price. In return, he sought to purchase that and other commemorative coins in quantities beyond the usual order limit. Nevertheless, when the Oregon Trail Memorial Association, issuer of the long-lived half dollar honoring the trail, tried to purchase a set, Melish replied that they were sold out.

By December, the bottom had dropped out of the commemorative coin market, and dealers who had purchased quantities found themselves unable to dispose of them at a profit. By 1940 the coin sets were selling for $15 per set. They thereafter recovered, and by the early 1960s had reached $100 a set, and by 1975 $550 per set of three. At the height of the second commemorative coin boom in 1980, they sold for $2,250 a set. R.S. Yeoman's A Guide Book of United States Coins, published in 2015, lists the sets at between $875 and $2,700 depending on condition. Individual coins are cataloged at about a third of the set prices.

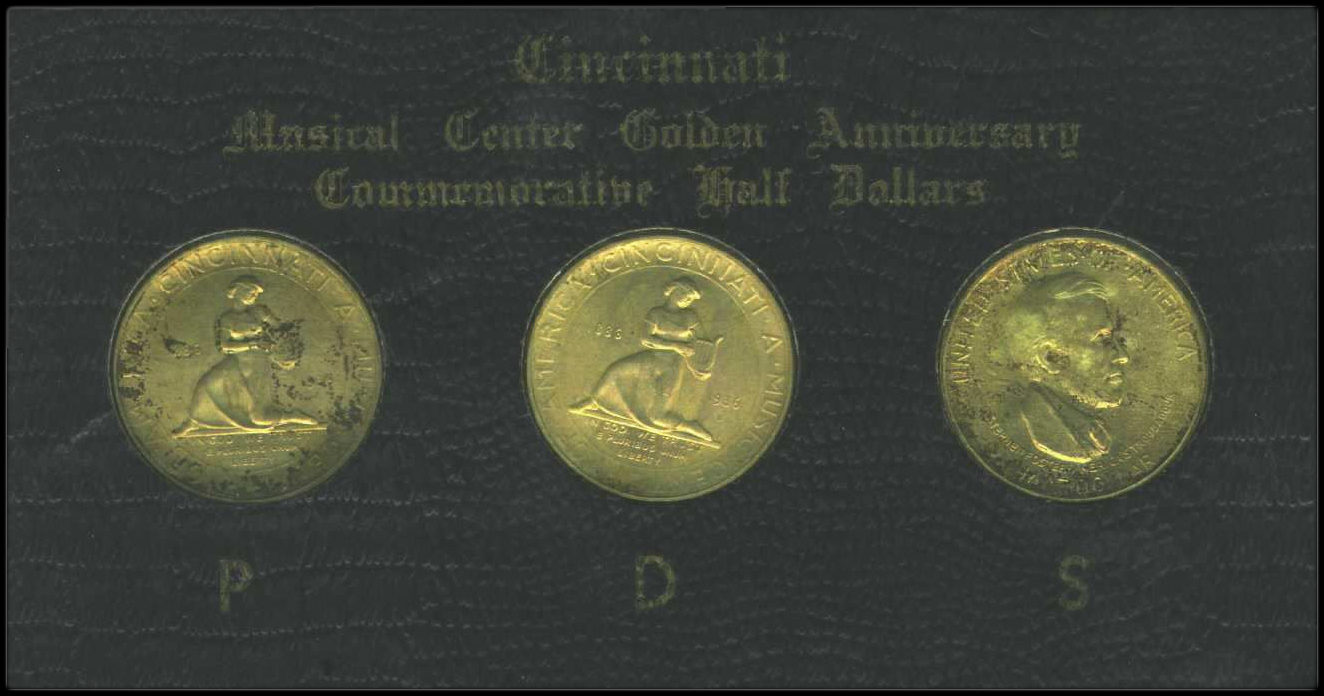
The Cincinnati set in holder of issue

The circumstances of the issuance were not clear at first: Mehl wrote that the coin was to honor the 50th anniversary of the "Cincinnati Musical Center" which was "founded in 1886" and that "either through good distribution or a great demand, the sets did not go around to all those who wanted them". Later numismatic writers have been harsh to Melish; Swiatek deemed the coin issued because of "false claims" on its behalf. Kevin Flynn, in his volume on commemoratives, stated that the Cincinnati piece "was made for pure profit and greed". Swiatek and Breen, in their 1988 book, suggest that Melish's group "had only one idea in mind: enriching themselves by publicizing and distributing a limited issue which could be priced into orbit by speculators".

With the success of the issue, Melish tried to get Congress to authorize 1937-dated pieces; he was not successful. He had managed to get Congress to allow another commemorative under his control, the 1936 Cleveland Centennial half dollar. In 1942, when the ANA held its annual convention in Cincinnati, Melish hosted a hospitality suite. Dubbed the "Pirate's Den", it featured paintings he had commissioned, depicting coin dealers and other numismatic personalities in piratical clothes. According to Bowers, "Overlooked was the fact that the greatest pirate of all was surely Melish himself, who undoubtedly treated many of his guests with money taken from them a few years earlier in the sale of Cincinnati sets!"
