= Jacob Bromwell (company) =

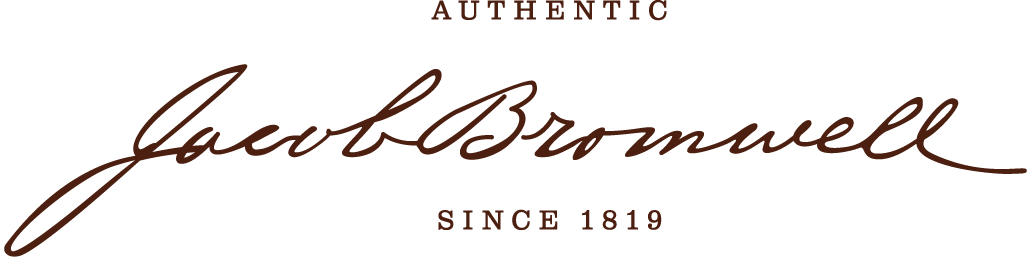
- Type: Private
- Industry: Retail
- Founded: 1819; 207 years ago
- Founder: Jacob Bromwell
- Headquarters: Markle, Indiana
- Areas served: Worldwide
- Key people: Sean Bandawat (CEO)
- Products: Flasks, Kitchenware, Housewares
- Website: jacobbromwell.com

Jacob Bromwell is a privately held American designer, manufacturer, marketer and distributor of flasks, kitchenware and housewares. Founded in 1819, it is the oldest housewares company in the United States. The company manufactures several historically significant products including the Original Popcorn Popper, Classic Tin Cup, and Legendary Flour Sifter. The Original Popcorn Popper is one of the company's oldest and best-selling items, and has been made with the original equipment and dies since the late 1800s, when the company acquired the patent from William Wood, its inventor. They were originally sold at a wholesale price of $3.50 for a gross. The Legendary Flour Sifter was patented in 1930 by a descendant of Jacob Bromwell's, Thomas G. Melish.

== Early history ==
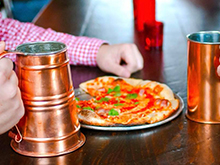
The company supplied pioneering families with a multitude of household goods.

Jacob Bromwell (born 1785), a soldier of the War of 1812 and entrepreneur, moved from Baltimore, Maryland to Cincinnati, Ohio via the Ohio River on a flatboat. He became the first wire goods manufacturer when he established The Bromwell Brush and Wire Goods Co. in 1819 and filed for incorporation on February 12, 1883. The company supplied pioneering families with a multitude of household goods. He founded his company in a six-story building at 181 Walnut Street in downtown Cincinnati, Ohio. The company occupied all six floors and boasted over 1,000 products in its catalogue, many of which won awards.

During its first 50 years of business, the company underwent several name changes, from The Bromwell Brush and Wire Goods Co. to The Bromwell Brush Manufacturing Company to The Bromwell Wire Goods Company.

In the late 1800s and early 1900s, the company operated seven factories, had upwards of 1,000 employees in multiple states, and was the largest business of its kind in the United States. It billed itself as having "the largest capacity in the country". Much of the company's manufacturing was done through convict labor at several prison workhouses where the company rented space and employed the prisoners at wages averaging about 35 cents per day.

== Ownership changes ==
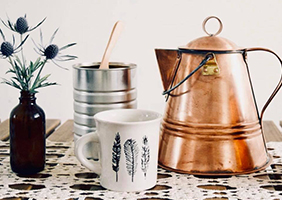
Household Goods

The company remained under the control of the Bromwell family until 1923, when they split the company and sold their interest for an undisclosed amount. The fireplace division of the company was sold to the Gerwe family, who opened a fireplace store named “Bromwell’s” in downtown Cincinnati, Ohio that is still open today. It is now owned by the McClorey family and has been since 2005. The housewares manufacturing portion of the company was sold to Leigh Products, Inc., a now defunct conglomerate holding company, and was renamed Bromwell Industries. Under the ownership of Leigh Products, Inc., the company was relocated to a 4-story building at 601 North Carroll Avenue in Michigan City, Indiana where it remained until 2010.

In 1985, Leigh Products, Inc. divested its interest in the company and sold the company outright to a private investor. The company was renamed Bromwell Housewares until 2010, when it was renamed Jacob Bromwell. Recently, Jacob Bromwell has seen a resurgence in sales by introducing new items and selling to new customers based on Jacob Bromwell's reputation for durability and quality.

== Current activities ==
Jacob Bromwell manufactures some of its products in Indiana and Vermont. The company sells its products via the Jacob Bromwell website as well as through authorized resellers in the United States and internationally. Jacob Bromwell is a notable customer of Shipwire, an eCommerce warehousing and order fulfillment company. In 2012, Jacob Bromwell reintroduced its historical line of copper cookware and accessories. In 2015, the company donated several historically significant pieces of its machinery and equipment to a permanent exhibit at the Indiana State Museum.
