= List of United States commemorative coins (1930s) =

== 1930 ==
=== Non-circulating coins ===
Face value	Coin	Obverse design	Reverse design	Composition	Mintage	Available	Obverse	Reverse
50¢	Gadsden Purchase half dollar (vetoed)	James Gadsden	Map of New Mexico, Arizona, and El Paso	90% Ag, 10% Cu	None authorized or minted	Never available		

== 1932 ==
=== Non-circulating coins ===
Face value	Coin	Obverse design	Reverse design	Composition	Mintage	Available	Obverse	Reverse
50¢	George Washington Bicentennial half dollar (vetoed) ^{[Note 1]}	George Washington	Unknown	90% Ag, 10% Cu	None authorized or minted	Never available		

=== Circulating coins ===
Denomination	Coin	Obverse design	Reverse design	Mintage	Obverse	Reverse
25¢	Washington quarter ^{[Note 2]}	George Washington	Eagle	Circulation: 5,404,000 (P); 436,800 D 408,000 S		
50¢	George Washington Bicentennial half dollar (cancelled) ^{[Note 3]}	George Washington	Unknown	None		

== 1933 ==
=== Non-circulating coins ===
Face value	Coin	Obverse design	Reverse design	Composition	Mintage	Available	Obverse	Reverse
50¢	Oregon Trail Memorial half dollar	Native American standing in front of a US map	Ox-drawn covered wagon being led west toward the setting Sun	90% Ag, 10% Cu	Authorized: 6,000,000 (max 1926–1939 total) Uncirculated: 5,008 D	1933		

== 1934 ==
=== Non-circulating coins ===
Face value	Coin	Obverse design	Reverse design	Composition	Mintage	Available	Obverse	Reverse
50¢	Oregon Trail Memorial half dollar	Native American standing in front of a US map	Ox-drawn covered wagon being led west toward the setting Sun	90% Ag, 10% Cu	Uncirculated: 7,006 D	1934		
50¢	Maryland Tercentenary half dollar	Cecil Calvert, 2nd Baron Baltimore	Arms of Maryland	90% Ag, 10% Cu	Authorized: 25,000 (max) Uncirculated: 25,015 (P)	1934		
50¢	Texas Centennial half dollar	Eagle sitting on a branch in front of the Lone Star, the symbol of Texas	Victory spreading her wings over the Alamo with Sam Houston on her left, Stephen F. Austin on her right, and the Six Flags of Texas flying above her head	90% Ag, 10% Cu	Authorized: 1,500,000 (max 1934–1938 total) Uncirculated: 205,113 (P)	1934		
50¢	Daniel Boone Bicentennial half dollar	Daniel Boone	Frontiersman facing a Native American	90% Ag, 10% Cu	Authorized: 600,000 (max 1934–1938 total) Uncirculated: 10,007 (P)	1934		

== 1935 ==
=== Non-circulating coins ===
Face value	Coin	Obverse design	Reverse design	Composition	Mintage	Available	Obverse	Reverse
50¢	Texas Centennial half dollar	Eagle sitting on a branch in front of the Lone Star, the symbol of Texas	Victory spreading her wings over the Alamo with Sam Houston on her left, Stephen F. Austin on her right, and the Six Flags of Texas flying above her head	90% Ag, 10% Cu	Uncirculated: 10,008 (P); 10,007 D 10,008 S	1935		
50¢	Daniel Boone Bicentennial half dollar	Daniel Boone	Frontiersman facing a Native American	90% Ag, 10% Cu	Uncirculated: 10,010 (P); 5,005 D 5,005 S	1935		
50¢	Daniel Boone Bicentennial half dollar (1934 on reverse)	Daniel Boone	Frontiersman facing a Native American, "1934" in field	90% Ag, 10% Cu	Pattern: 1 S (copper) Uncirculated: 10,008 (P); 2,003 D 2,004 S	1935		
50¢	Arkansas Centennial half dollar	Native American and Liberty	Eagle	90% Ag, 10% Cu	Authorized: 500,000 (max 1935–1939 total) Uncirculated: 13,012 (P); 5,505 D 5,506 S	1935		
50¢	California Pacific International Exposition half dollar	Minerva and other elements of the Seal of California	California Tower and Chapel of St. Francis, Balboa Park, San Diego	90% Ag, 10% Cu	Authorized: 250,000 (max 1935–1936 total) Uncirculated: 250,132 S	1935		
50¢	Connecticut Tercentenary half dollar	Charter Oak	Eagle	90% Ag, 10% Cu	Authorized: 25,000 (max) Uncirculated: 25,018 (P)	1935		
50¢	Hudson Sesquicentennial half dollar	The Half Moon	Seal of the city of Hudson	90% Ag, 10% Cu	Authorized: 10,000 (max) Uncirculated: 10,008 (P)	1935		
50¢	Old Spanish Trail half dollar	The head of a cow	Yucca plant superimposed on map of the Gulf Coast states	90% Ag, 10% Cu	Authorized: 10,000 (max) Uncirculated: 10,008 (P)	1935		

== 1936 ==
=== Non-circulating coins ===
Face value	Coin	Obverse design	Reverse design	Composition	Mintage	Available	Obverse	Reverse
50¢	Oregon Trail Memorial half dollar	Native American standing in front of a US map	Ox-drawn covered wagon being led west toward the setting Sun	90% Ag, 10% Cu	Uncirculated: 10,006 (P); 5,006 S	1936		
50¢	Texas Centennial half dollar	Eagle sitting on a branch in front of the Lone Star, the symbol of Texas	Victory spreading her wings over the Alamo with Sam Houston on her left, Stephen F. Austin on her right, and the Six Flags of Texas flying above her head	90% Ag, 10% Cu	Uncirculated: 10,008 (P); 10,007 D 10,008 S	1936		
50¢	Daniel Boone Bicentennial half dollar	Daniel Boone	Frontiersman facing a Native American, "1934" in field	90% Ag, 10% Cu	Uncirculated: 12,012 (P); 5,005 D 5,006 S	1936		
50¢	Arkansas Centennial half dollar	Native American and Liberty	Eagle	90% Ag, 10% Cu	Uncirculated: 10,010 (P); 10,010 D 10,012 S	1936		
50¢	Arkansas-Robinson half dollar	Joseph T. Robinson	Eagle	90% Ag, 10% Cu	Authorized: 25,000 (min); 50,000 (max) Uncirculated: 25,265 (P)	1936		
50¢	California Pacific International Exposition half dollar	Minerva and other elements of the Seal of California	California Tower and Chapel of St. Francis, Balboa Park, San Diego	90% Ag, 10% Cu	Uncirculated: 180,092 D	1936		
50¢	Cleveland Centennial half dollar	Moses Cleaveland	Map of the Great Lakes with cities marked by stars and with a compass point marking Cleveland	90% Ag, 10% Cu	Authorized: 50,000 (max) Uncirculated: 50,030 (P)	1936		
50¢	Wisconsin Territorial Centennial half dollar	Arm holding pickax with a pile of rocks	Badger, three arrows, and an olive branch	90% Ag, 10% Cu	Authorized: 25,000 (min) Uncirculated: 25,015 (P)	1936		
50¢	Long Island Tercentenary half dollar	Native American and Dutch settler	Dutch sailing vessel	90% Ag, 10% Cu	Authorized: 100,000 (max) Uncirculated: 100,053 (P)	1936		
50¢	York County, Maine Tercentenary half dollar	Brown's Garrison	York County Seal	90% Ag, 10% Cu	Authorized: 30,000 (max) Uncirculated: 25,015 (P)	1936		
50¢	Bridgeport, Connecticut, Centennial half dollar	P.T. Barnum	Eagle	90% Ag, 10% Cu	Authorized: 25,000 (min) Uncirculated: 25,015 (P)	1936		
50¢	Lynchburg Sesquicentennial half dollar	Bust of Carter Glass	Liberty	90% Ag, 10% Cu	Authorized: 20,000 (min) Uncirculated: 20,013 (P)	1936		
50¢	Elgin, Illinois, Centennial half dollar	Bust of a pioneer	Pioneer family	90% Ag, 10% Cu	Authorized: 25,000 (max) Uncirculated: 25,015 (P)	1936		
50¢	Albany Charter half dollar	Beaver	Thomas Dongan, Pieter Schuyler, and Robert Livingston	90% Ag, 10% Cu	Authorized: 25,000 (max) Uncirculated: 25,013 (P)	1936		
50¢	San Francisco–Oakland Bay Bridge half dollar	Grizzly Bear	San Francisco–Oakland Bay Bridge	90% Ag, 10% Cu	Authorized: 200,000 (max) Uncirculated: 100,055 (S)	1936–37		
50¢	Rhode Island Tercentenary half dollar	Roger Williams meeting a Native American	Anchor; adaptation of the Seal of Rhode Island	90% Ag, 10% Cu	Authorized: 50,000 (max) Uncirculated: 20,013 (P); 15,010 D 15,011 S	1936		
50¢	Cincinnati Musical Center half dollar	Bust of Stephen Foster	Allegorical figure with lyre	90% Ag, 10% Cu	Authorized: 15,000 (max) Uncirculated: 5,005 (P); 5,005 D 5,006 S	1936		
50¢	Columbia, South Carolina Sesquicentennial half dollar	Justice holding a sword and scales	Palmetto tree	90% Ag, 10% Cu	Authorized: 25,000 (max) Uncirculated: 9,007 (P); 8,009 D 8,007 S	1936		

== 1937 ==
=== Non-circulating coins ===
Face value	Coin	Obverse design	Reverse design	Composition	Mintage	Available	Obverse	Reverse
50¢	Oregon Trail Memorial half dollar	Native American standing in front of a US map	Ox-drawn covered wagon being led west toward the setting Sun	90% Ag, 10% Cu	Uncirculated: 12,008 D	1937		
50¢	Texas Centennial half dollar	Eagle sitting on a branch in front of the Lone Star, the symbol of Texas	Victory spreading her wings over the Alamo with Sam Houston on her left, Stephen F. Austin on her right, and the Six Flags of Texas flying above her head	90% Ag, 10% Cu	Uncirculated: 8,005 (P); 8,006 D 8,007 S	1937		
50¢	Daniel Boone Bicentennial half dollar	Daniel Boone	Frontiersman facing a Native American, "1934" in field	90% Ag, 10% Cu	Uncirculated: 15,010 (P); 7,506 D 5,006 S	1937		
50¢	Arkansas Centennial half dollar	Native American and Liberty	Eagle	90% Ag, 10% Cu	Uncirculated: 5,505 (P); 5,505 D 5,506 S	1937		
50¢	Norfolk, Virginia, Bicentennial half dollar (dated 1936)	City seal of Norfolk, Virginia	Norfolk's ceremonial mace	90% Ag, 10% Cu	Authorized: 25,000 (max) Uncirculated: 25,013 (P)	1937		
50¢	Delaware Tercentenary half dollar (dated 1936)	Old Swedes Church	Kalmar Nyckel	90% Ag, 10% Cu	Authorized: 25,000 (min) Uncirculated: 25,015 (P)	1937		
50¢	Battle of Gettysburg half dollar (dated 1936)	Union and Confederate soldiers	Union and Confederate shields separated by a fasces	90% Ag, 10% Cu	Authorized: 50,000 (max) Uncirculated: 50,028 (P)	1937		
50¢	Roanoke Island, North Carolina half dollar	Walter Raleigh	Ellinore Dare holding her child, Virginia Dare	90% Ag, 10% Cu	Authorized: 25,000 (min) Uncirculated: 50,030 (P)	1937		
50¢	Battle of Antietam half dollar	George B. McClellan and Robert E. Lee	Burnside's Bridge	90% Ag, 10% Cu	Authorized: 50,000 (max) Uncirculated: 50,028 (P)	1937		
50¢	New Rochelle 250th Anniversary half dollar (dated 1938)	Sir John Pell and "Fatte Calfe"	Fleur de lis	90% Ag, 10% Cu	Authorized: 25,000 (max) Uncirculated: 25,015 (P)	1938		

== 1938 ==
=== Non-circulating coins ===
Face value	Coin	Obverse design	Reverse design	Composition	Mintage	Available	Obverse	Reverse
50¢	Oregon Trail Memorial half dollar	Native American standing in front of a US map	Ox-drawn covered wagon being led west toward the setting Sun	90% Ag, 10% Cu	Uncirculated: 6,006 (P); 6,005 D 6,006 S	1938		
50¢	Texas Centennial half dollar	Eagle sitting on a branch in front of the Lone Star, the symbol of Texas	Victory spreading her wings over the Alamo with Sam Houston on her left, Stephen F. Austin on her right, and the Six Flags of Texas flying above her head	90% Ag, 10% Cu	Uncirculated: 5,005 (P); 5,005 D 5,006 S	1938		
50¢	Daniel Boone Bicentennial half dollar	Daniel Boone	Frontiersman facing a Native American, "1934" in field	90% Ag, 10% Cu	Uncirculated: 5,005 (P); 5,005 D 5,006 S	1938		
50¢	Arkansas Centennial half dollar	Native American and Liberty	Eagle	90% Ag, 10% Cu	Uncirculated: 3,156 (P); 3,155 D 3,156 S	1938		
50¢	Coronado Expedition half dollar (vetoed)	Unknown	Unknown	90% Ag, 10% Cu	None authorized or minted	Never available		

== 1939 ==
=== Non-circulating coins ===
Face value	Coin	Obverse design	Reverse design	Composition	Mintage	Available	Obverse	Reverse
50¢	Oregon Trail Memorial half dollar	Native American standing in front of a US map	Ox-drawn covered wagon being led west toward the setting Sun	90% Ag, 10% Cu	Uncirculated: 3,004 (P); 3,004 D 3,005 S	1939		
50¢	Arkansas Centennial half dollar	Native American and Liberty	Eagle	90% Ag, 10% Cu	Uncirculated: 2,104 (P); 2,104 D 2,105 S	1939		

== Notes ==
^1 The George Washington Bicentennial half dollar was originally proposed as a traditional non-circulating commemorative coin. However, President Herbert Hoover vetoed the proposal in 1930.
^2 The Washington quarter was originally intended to be struck in 1932 only. The design was found to be popular with the public, and was produced again in 1934 (no quarters were struck in 1933). The coin has been in production as a regular issue coin ever since, although the 1932 quarter is considered the only commemorative eagle reverse Washington quarter.
^3 The George Washington Bicentennial half dollar was again proposed as a circulation coin. Washington was to appear on the half dollar for one year only in 1932. However, due to the lack of demand because of the Great Depression, no half dollars were minted for circulation for three years from 1930 to 1932. Washington quarters were struck instead.
