= Arkansas Centennial half dollar =

United States commemorative coin

- United States
- Value: 50 cents (0.50 US dollars)
- Mass: 12.5 g
- Diameter: 30.6 mm
- Edge: Reeded
- Composition: 90.0% silver; 10.0% copper
- Silver: 0.3617 troy oz
- Years of minting: 1935–1939
- Mint marks: D, S. Under the eagle on the right. Coins minted at the Philadelphia Mint feature no mint mark.

Obverse
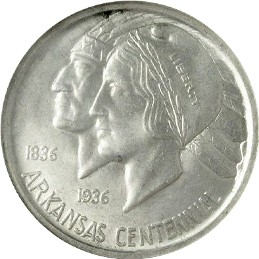
- Design: Liberty in Phrygian cap and Indian chief
- Designer: Edward Everett Burr
- Design date: 1935

Reverse
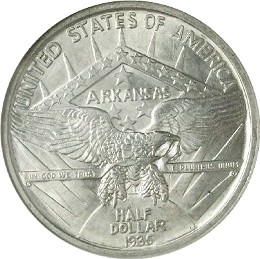
- Design: Eagle, Arkansas state flag
- Designer: Edward Everett Burr
- Design date: 1935

The Arkansas Centennial half dollar is a commemorative fifty-cent piece struck by the United States Bureau of the Mint from 1935 to 1939. The coin was designed by Edward Everett Burr and commemorates the 100th anniversary of Arkansas's admission to the Union in 1836.

The Arkansas–Robinson half dollar, a special issue of the coin featuring a different design, was minted in 1936.

== Legislation ==
Arkansas was admitted to the Union on June 15, 1836, as the 25th state. The Arkansas Honorary Centennial Celebration Commission, later known as the Arkansas Centennial Commission, was organized to plan a celebration for the hundredth anniversary of Arkansas's statehood in 1936. In February 1934, the commission requested Senator Hattie Caraway to support the minting of commemorative 50-cent coins for the statehood centennial. In the 1930s, commemorative coins were sold at a premium to the public by a designated private organization named in the authorizing legislation. During that time several states had commemorative coins issued to fund local celebrations. The commission also requested that a commemorative postage stamp be issued. Caraway responded to the commission that she would support the request.

On February 26, 1934, Caraway introduced a bill to "authorize the coinage of 50-cent pieces in commemoration of the one hundredth anniversary of the admission of the State of Arkansas into the Union" to the United States Senate; the bill was referred to the Senate Committee on Banking and Currency. The committee offered no amendments to the bill, which the Senate passed on March 20. The bill was approved by the United States House of Representatives on May 7 and enacted into law on May 14, 1934.

== Preparation ==
The Arkansas Centennial Commission requested Arkansas residents to submit designs for the coin while the bill was still in the House. Caraway expressed support for a design from commission member C. R. Cordell, which featured a log cabin on the obverse and the Arkansas State Capitol on the reverse. Thirty designs were submitted, and in July 1934 the commission chose a design from Edward Everett Burr, an artist originally from Paragould, Arkansas. The commission selected Emily Bates of Batesville, Arkansas to sculpt the plaster model of the design.

On July 27, Commission of Fine Arts (CFA) chairman Charles Moore wrote a letter to Acting Mint Director Mary M. O'Reilly that the CFA rejected the design due to its "unsuitability for a coin of the United States" and ask that the Arkansas commission submit another sketch. The letter was forwarded to A. W. Parke, the executive secretary of the Arkansas Centennial Commission. Both Parke and Caraway requested more details on the rejection; CFA secretary H. P. Caemmerer replied to Caraway in a letter dated August 31, who explained that the CFA had doubt regarding Burr's abilities and questioned his experience in medallic art. The Arkansas commission opposed dismissing Burr, and on September 18, Caemmerer wrote to Caraway that the CFA supported retaining Burr as the artist but requested that he submit new designs. Caemmerer also wrote to Lorado Taft asking that he supervise both Burr and Bates as the CFA still had doubts about their artistic skill.

Undetered, Burr replied to Caemmerer on October 1 opposing altering the designs, emphasizing the significance elements of the design had to Arkansas history. CFA member Lee Lawrie, in a letter to Moore, suggested that the design elements be included but in a more "coin-like" design. On October 10, Caemmerer sent Lawire's suggestion to Taft, asking that Burr submit a revised design. Burr sent a new sketch to the Caemmerer on November 2 which was received much more positively, and the CFA returned the sketch on December 5 asking only that he include the "1935" date on the coin.

The design was modeled by Emily Bates while she was working at Taft's studio in Chicago.

== Design ==
The coin's obverse features a depiction of Liberty in a Phrygian cap, while the reverse features elements of the state flag and diamond-shaped symbols representing the state's diamond fields, at the time the only known in the country.

In their book, Anthony Swiatek and Walter Breen opined that the reverse design was littered with Confederate symbolism, including that the seven largest rays represented the seven original Confederate states, that the rising sun was intended to show that "the South will rise again", and that the total of 13 stars represented all of the eventual seceding states. Breen also suggested that the 1936 date could be taken to represent the 75th anniversary of Arkansas joining the Confederacy. This analysis has been called into question by later scholars.

In 1936, the Arkansas Centennial Commission attempted to get a bill passed that would have authorized three new reverse designs for their commemorative half dollars. This followed the lead of the Texas Centennial Commission's bill that sought to create five new reverses for that coin. While the Texas bill failed, the Arkansas Commission succeeded in getting a single new design approved, which became the Arkansas-Robinson half dollar, issued in 1937, but dated 1936.

== Production and collecting ==
Minting commenced in Philadelphia in May 1935 in advance of local celebrations of the centennial, and the available mintage was sold out by September before the authorizing committee ordered additional specimens in November; these later coins were also struck at Denver and San Francisco, and were purchased in batches by dealer B. Max Mehl. Later strikings of the coins from 1936-39 were bought up by dealers like Stack's in New York City and Mehl in Texas. As a result, many of the coins could be easily found anywhere other than Arkansas.

Proceeds from the sale of the coin were used to finance welcome stations as well as printing and distribution of centennial promotion material.

Today, the issue is one of the more available classic commemoratives for type-set collectors, with a total of 85,700 issued by the Mint. The later issues were sold for $8.75 per three-coin set, (later raised to $10.00). Numismatist Q. David Bowers wrote that since the issue has never been popular with collectors, the later strikings are still affordable despite their low mintages. Many coins have "greasy" surfaces due to poor striking.

== See also ==
- List of United States commemorative coins and medals (1930s)
