= Arkansas–Robinson half dollar =

United States commemorative coin

- United States
- Value: 50 cents (0.50 US dollars)
- Mass: 12.5 g
- Diameter: 30.6 mm
- Edge: Reeded
- Composition: 90.0% silver 10.0% copper
- Silver: 0.3617 troy oz
- Years of minting: 1935
- Mintage: 25,265
- Mint marks: None, all pieces struck at the Philadelphia Mint without mint mark.

Obverse
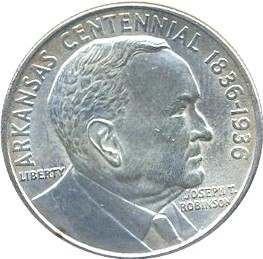
- Design: Joseph T. Robinson
- Designer: Henry Kreis
- Design date: 1936

Reverse
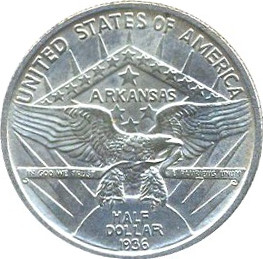
- Design: Eagle, Arkansas state flag
- Designer: Edward E. Burr
- Design date: 1935

The Arkansas–Robinson half dollar is a commemorative fifty-cent piece struck by the United States Bureau of the Mint in 1936. It is a special issue of the Arkansas Centennial half dollar featuring a different reverse design from Henry Kreis.

The coin features Joseph Taylor Robinson, who represented Arkansas in the U.S. Senate at the time. He was the fourth of four living persons depicted on U.S. coinage.

== Design and history ==
In 1936, with the Arkansas Centennial half dollar already in its second year of production, the Arkansas Centennial Commission responsible for the coins' production and distribution following in the lead of the Texas Centennial Commission, sought a bill for three new reverse designs on its coinage. Despite previously denying the Texas commission's request, Congress authorized Public Law 74–831 (Pub. L. 74–831), which allowed the Arkansas commission the opportunity to create one new reverse design.

Originally the commemorative was intended the depict one side of a coin Fernando De Soto supposedly presented to a Native American woman in Arkansas during his exploration of the state.

The coins, which were not struck until January 1937, retailed for $1.85 each when released.

== Production and collecting ==
With a maximum authorized mintage of 50,000 pieces, the Mint struck 25,250 "business-strike" coins along with a reported eight Satin Finish proof strikes, which were popular at the time. Four of these were presented to noted coin dealer Wayte Raymond, one presented to Robinson, and another earmarked for President Franklin D. Roosevelt. As with the Centennial halves, Stack's was chosen as the official distributor.

Eight satin finish proof pieces were struck, with four going to noted dealer Wayte Raymond. Raymond purchased a considerable quantity of the coins, once attempting to sell a batch of 8,000 to Abe Kosoff.

Unlike the Arkansas Centennial half dollar, this coin was a one-year only type issue, and as such, more pressure is placed on the coin from type collectors needing one to complete a set.

== See also ==
- List of United States commemorative coins and medals (1930s)
- Arkansas Centennial half dollar, a separate coin, issued from 1936-39.
