= Iowa Centennial half dollar =

United States commemorative coin

- United States
- Value: 50 cents (0.50 US dollars)
- Mass: 12.5 g
- Diameter: 30.61 mm (1.20 in)
- Thickness: 2.15 mm (0.08 in)
- Edge: Reeded
- Composition: 90.0% silver; 10.0% copper
- Silver: 0.36169 troy oz
- Years of minting: 1946
- Mintage: 100,057 (100,000 coins were authorized)
- Mint marks: None, all pieces struck at the Philadelphia Mint without mint mark

Obverse
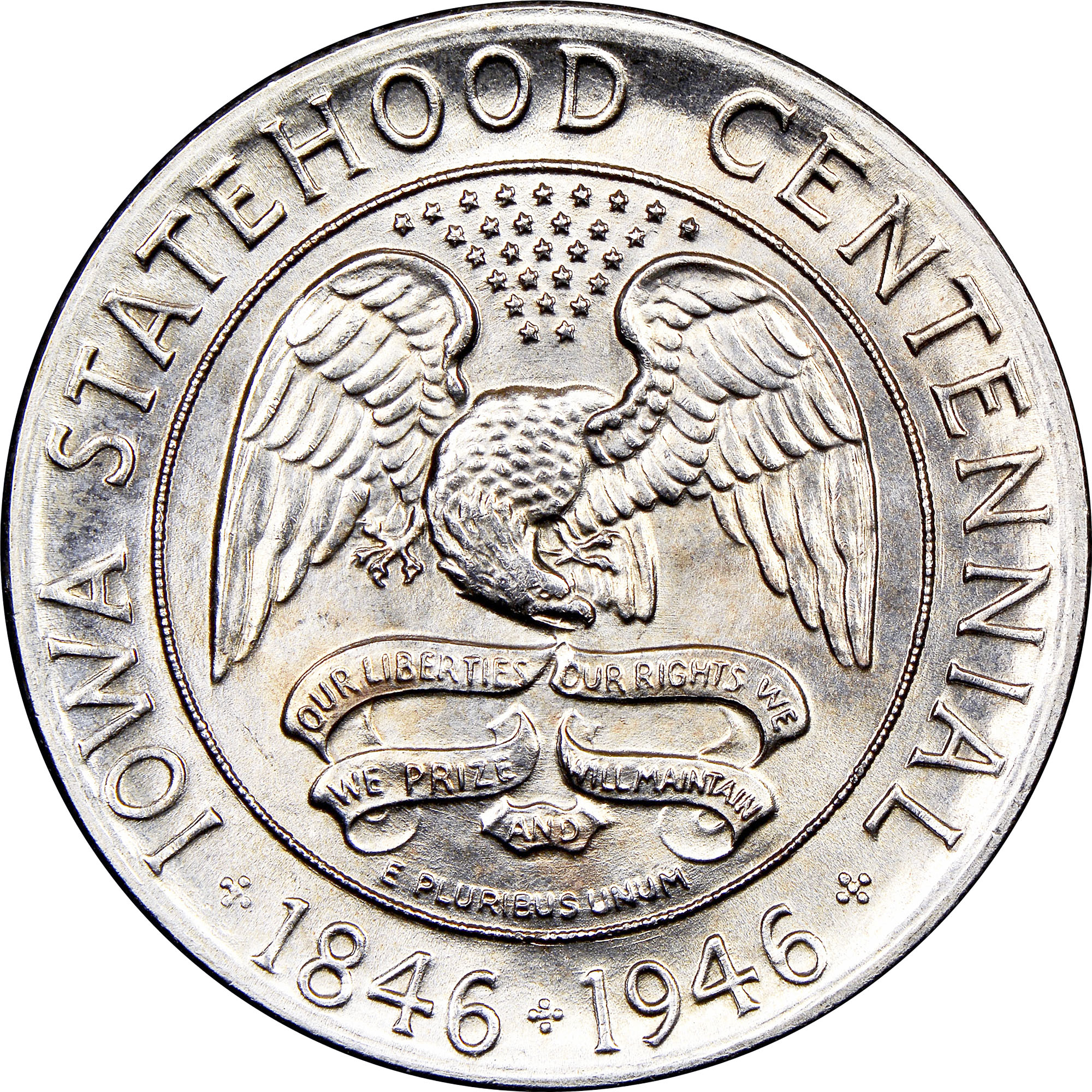
- Design: Iowa state seal
- Designer: Adam Pietz
- Design date: 1946

Reverse
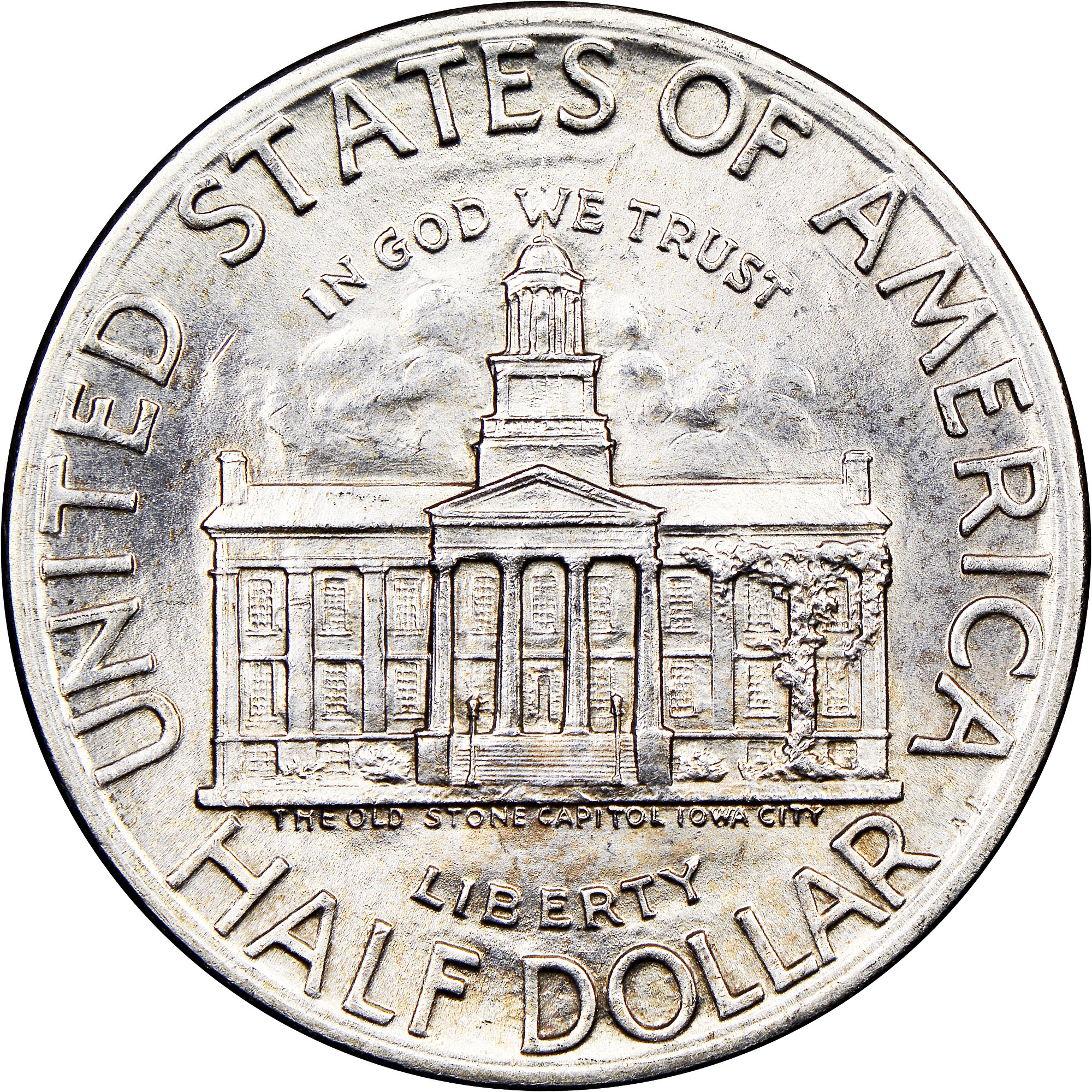
- Design: Old Stone Capitol
- Designer: Adam Pietz
- Design date: 1946

The Iowa Centennial half dollar was designed by Adam Pietz and minted in 1946. The reverse depicts the Iowa Old Capitol Building (also known as the "Old Stone Capitol") in Iowa City, and the obverse shows the state seal.

== History ==
Since 1936, no new commemorative coins had been approved, as the many abuses and scandals involved with past commemorative coin issues had caused both Congress and then-president Franklin D. Roosevelt to oppose any bills for new commemoratives, especially after a Congressional hearing held on April 15, 1937. However, with Harry S. Truman in office, the state of Iowa was able to get the bill for the Iowa Centennial half dollar passed on August 7, 1946. The bill authorized a minimum of 100,000 coins to be minted. Former mint engraver Adam Pietz was selected by Mint director Nellie Tayloe Ross to design and sculpt the coin.

The coins were sold by the Iowa Centennial Committee $2.50 for Iowans, and $3 for those outside of the state. The discounted price for Iowans came as a result of the committee wanting all Iowans to buy a coin if they wanted one. The profits from the sale of the coins were put into a perpetual charitable trust fund overseen by the Iowa Centennial Memorial Foundation, which uses the endowment to bestow the Iowa Award and grant in-state collegiate academic scholarships. A majority of the coins minted were sold, with 500 pieces was set side for distribution in 1996, and 500 more for 2046. In 1996, the coins that were set aside for release that year were offered for $500 each in special holders.

== See also ==
- Early United States commemorative coins
- Half dollar (United States coin)
