= Columbia, South Carolina, Sesquicentennial half dollar =

United States commemorative coin

Columbia, South Carolina Sesquicentennial half dollar
- United States
- Value: 50 cents (0.50 US dollars)
- Mass: 12.5 g
- Diameter: 30.61 mm (1.20 in)
- Thickness: 2.15 mm (0.08 in)
- Edge: Reeded (Note: The edge is ridged.)
- Composition: 90.0% silver; 10.0% copper
- Silver: 0.36169 troy oz
- Years of minting: 1936
- Mintage: 25,023 (25,000 authorized) including 23 pieces for the Assay Commission Philadelphia Mint: 9,007 Denver Mint: 8,009 San Francisco Mint: 8,007
- Mint marks: D, S. Located beneath the figure of Justice on the obverse. Coins struck at the Philadelphia Mint have no mint mark.

Obverse
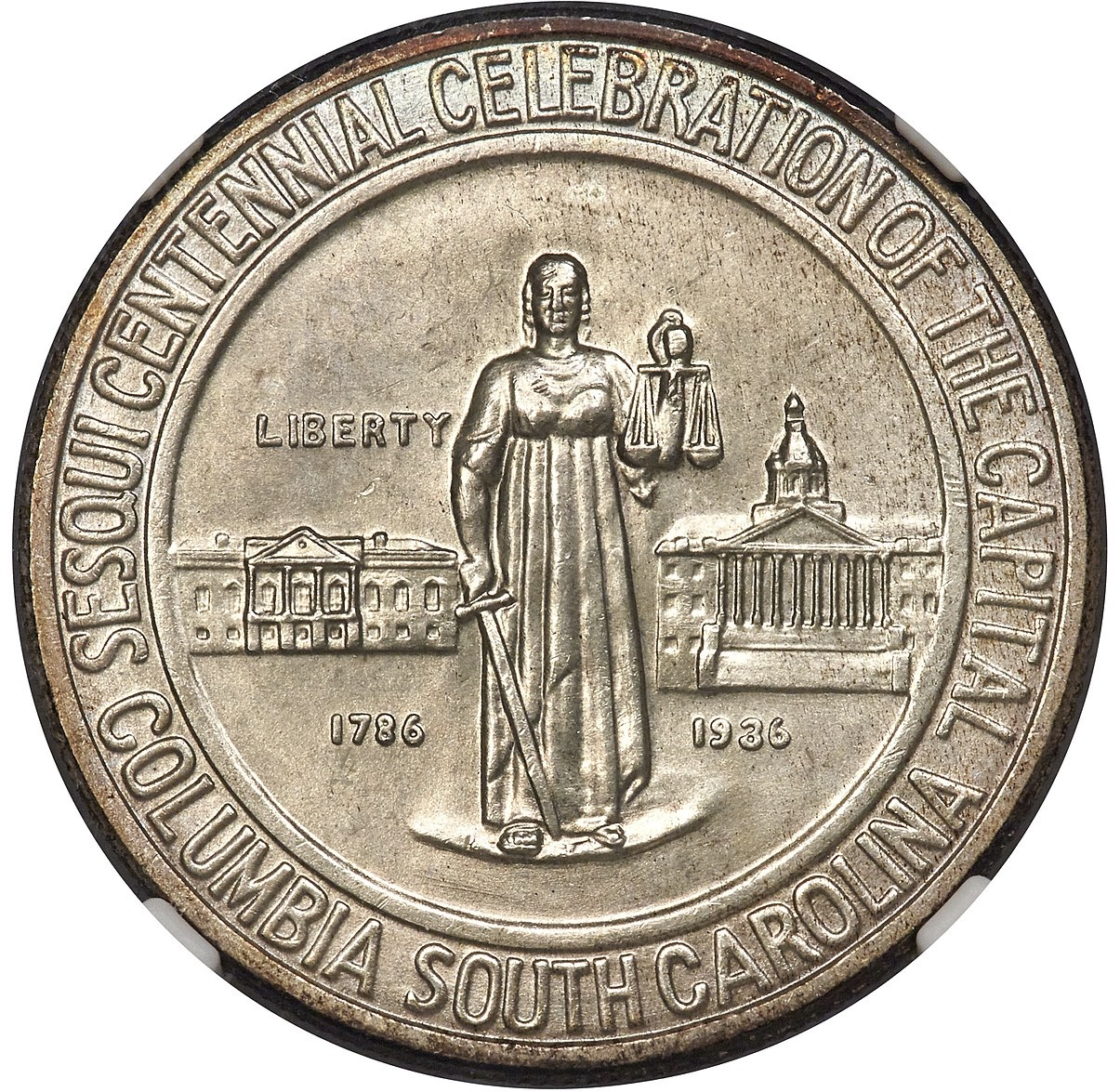
- Design: Lady Justice holding a sword and scales; Columbia's old and new State Houses
- Designer: Abraham Wolfe Davidson
- Design date: 1936

Reverse
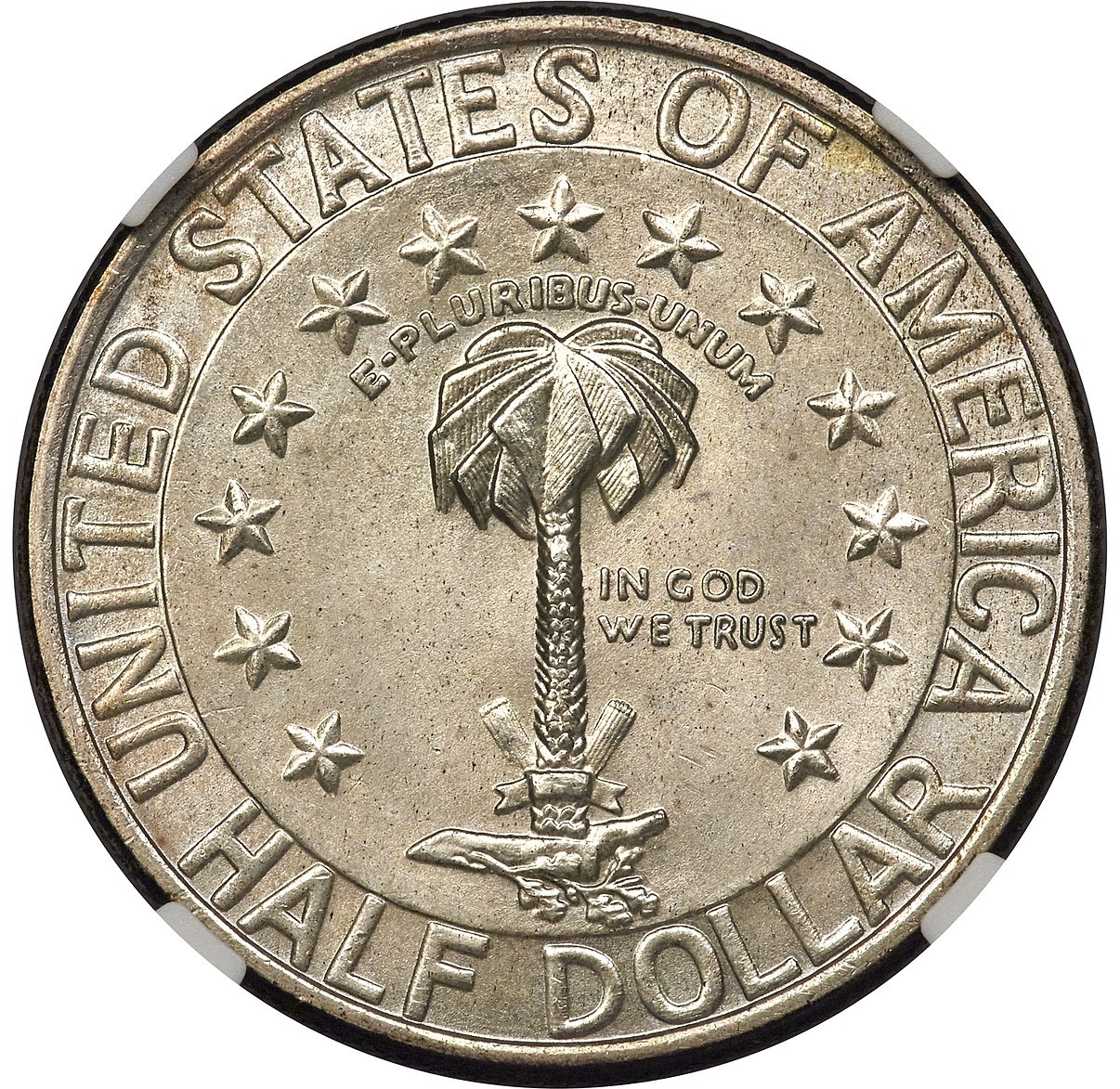
- Design: Palmetto tree surrounded by 13 stars, with arrows bound to it; below a broken oaken branch
- Designer: Abraham Wolfe Davidson
- Design date: 1936

The Columbia, South Carolina, Sesquicentennial half dollar was a commemorative fifty-cent piece struck by the United States Bureau of the Mint. Designed by Abraham Wolfe Davidson and minted in 1936, it marks the 150th anniversary of the designation of Columbia as South Carolina's state capital.

The obverse design depicts Lady Justice holding a sword and scales, standing between South Carolina's Old State House, built in 1790, and the New State House, completed in 1903. The reverse shows the palmetto tree, South Carolina's state symbol, surrounded by 13 stars representing the original Thirteen Colonies, though they may also be intended to represent the Confederate States.

Despite growing opposition to commemorative coins, legislation for the Columbia half dollars passed Congress unopposed in 1936. The Commission of Fine Arts did not like Davidson's designs, and unsuccessfully sought his replacement. The coins were struck in September 1936, but they were slow to be distributed. Once they were, they were sold in small quantities, frustrating coin dealers who hoped to accumulate more to resell to their customers. The mintage of 25,000 was distributed; no coins were returned to the Mint for redemption and melting. They generally sell in the hundreds of dollars range today, depending on condition.

== Background ==
The area around what is now Columbia, South Carolina, was settled by British colonials as early as 1718, when Fort Congaree was established at Granby, South Carolina, near the city's present site. Following the end of the American Revolutionary War, the South Carolina Legislature was concerned that the state capital, Charleston, was too vulnerable to attack by sea and too far from the agricultural lands being developed. Accordingly, in 1786, Columbia was designated to be the new capital, one of the first planned cities in the United States. The legislature first met there at the Old State House in 1790. That building proved subject to flooding and damp—a poor place to store important state records. Work began on a new building in 1856 but was interrupted by the American Civil War; the Old State House was burned following its capture by Union troops in 1865. South Carolina had little money for capitol construction after the war, and the new building was not completed until 1903.

Until 1954, the entire mintage of commemorative coin issues was sold by the government at face value to a group authorized by Congress, who then tried to sell the coins at a profit to the public. The new pieces then came on to the secondary market. In early 1936 all earlier commemoratives sold at a premium to their issue prices. The apparent easy profits to be made by purchasing and holding commemoratives attracted many to the hobby of coin collecting, where they sought to purchase the new issues. This led to many commemorative coin proposals in Congress, including some of purely local significance. These bills passed although the Treasury Department opposed the issuance of commemorative coins, and President Franklin D. Roosevelt had in 1935 asked that Congress pass no more such bills. The group designated to purchase the Columbia half dollar from the government was a committee to be established by Columbia's mayor (who in 1936 was Lawrence B. Owens), with the committee consisting of not fewer than three people.

== Legislation ==
The coin was proposed by the Columbia Sesqui-Centennial Commission. Legislation to authorize a Columbia half dollar was introduced in the House of Representatives on June 17, 1935, by South Carolina's Hampton P. Fulmer. It was referred to the Committee on Coinage, Weights, and Measures. That committee reported back through Andrew Somers of New York on February 17, 1936, recommending passage of the bill with amendments. These included increasing the authorized mintage from 10,000 to 25,000 coins, and requiring that the coins be ordered by a committee of not less than three people appointed by Columbia's mayor, who, under the original bill, was to designate the individual(s) responsible for ordering the coins.

Fulmer brought the bill to the floor of the House of Representatives on February 24, 1936. Bertrand H. Snell of New York asked if the bill had come from the Coinage Committee. Fulmer stated that it had, and it was being pressed now in the hope of having coins to sell at the celebrations in Columbia in March. Snell stated that he had wanted such a coin at the request of some people from his part of the country, but had learned it was against Treasury Department policy. Jesse P. Wolcott of Michigan noted that he and others from that state had tried to get a coin for the centennial of its admission to the Union. They had not pressed the matter only because of Treasury Department opposition and the threat of a presidential veto. Thomas J. O'Brien of Illinois demanded the regular order, and the bill was amended and passed without opposition or further debate.

In the Senate, the bill was referred to the Committee on Banking and Currency. South Carolina's James F. Byrnes reported it back on March 3, 1936, recommending a number of minor amendments which stressed that the anniversary commemorated was not the founding of the city, but of it being the capital of South Carolina. The Senate amended the bill and passed it without discussion or dissent. As the two houses had passed versions that were not identical, the bill returned to the House of Representatives, where, on March 5, Fulmer asked that the House adopt the Senate amendments, which it did. The bill, providing for 25,000 half dollars, became law with the signature of President Roosevelt on March 18, 1936.

== Preparation ==
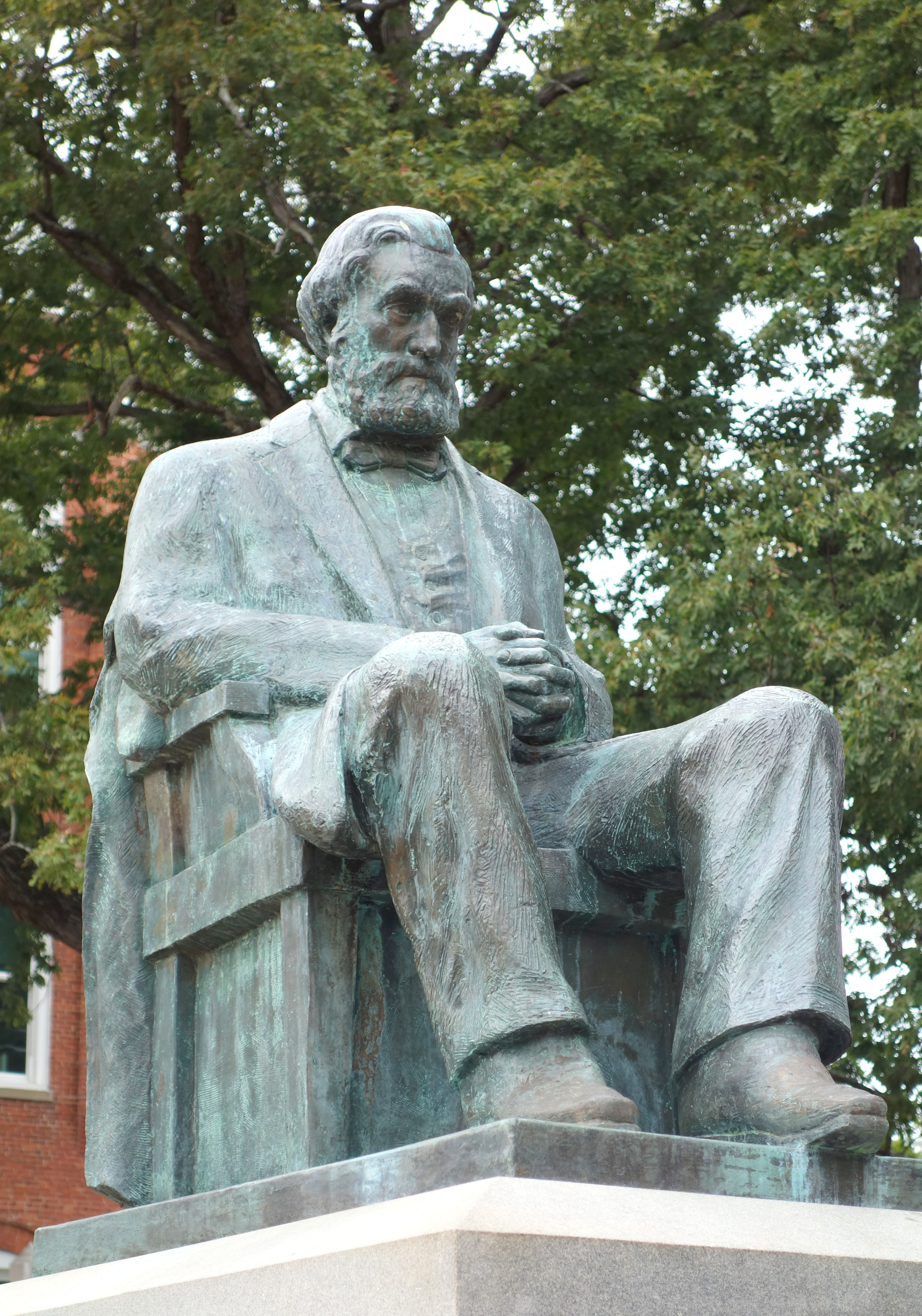
Davidson's sculpture of Thomas G. Clemson

The Sesqui-Centennial Commission selected 32-year-old sculptor Abraham Wolfe Davidson of Clemson College to design the coin. Davidson, a Jewish immigrant from Russia, had reached a deal with Clemson administrators whereby he would sculpt a statue of its founder, Thomas G. Clemson, in exchange for room, board and tuition. His completed plaster models of the coin were sent to the Commission of Fine Arts (CFA) by the Director of the United States Mint, Nellie Tayloe Ross, on May 25, 1936. A 1921 executive order by President Warren G. Harding charged the CFA with rendering advisory opinions regarding public artworks, including coins, and Ross wanted the CFA's opinion. She recognized there were visible defects in Davidson's design, and said that they were "unsatisfactory" and 'lack artistic merit". CFA chair, Charles Moore agreed with Ross's assessment in a letter dated June 1, 1936, and suggested the South Carolina commission hire an experienced medalist. According to Eric Brothers in his article on Davidson for The Numismatist: "The Sesquicentennial Committee would not budge; Davidson was Columbia's and Clemson's talented, adopted son."

On June 13, Ross returned the models to Davidson and wrote to James Hammond, chair of the Sesqui-Centennial Commission, saying she had returned the models and setting forth the Mint's technical requirements for coinage models. Thereafter, Davidson worked under the supervision of Lee Lawrie, sculptor-member of the CFA. The figure of Justice on the obverse was made less "slumpy", and the leaves of the palmetto on the reverse idealized. The revised models were recommended by the CFA on July 22, and subsequently were approved by Treasury Secretary Henry Morgenthau.

== Design ==
The Seal of South Carolina depicts the palmetto tree, with the same symbolism as the coin.

The obverse of the Columbia half dollar depicts Lady Justice, bearing a sword and a set of scales, though lacking the blindfold used in many depictions. To her left and right are South Carolina's old and new state houses, with one of the anniversary dates under each. If the coin was struck at the Denver Mint or at San Francisco, the appropriate mint mark appears beneath her—D or S. At the time, the Philadelphia Mint did not use one. The word LIBERTY appears to her left, and a statement of the anniversary rings the design.

The reverse depicts a palmetto tree, the emblem of South Carolina. Arrows are tied to its base in a saltire pattern by a broad ribbon, signifying the tree's military connotation. On June 28, 1776, a British naval squadron tried to seize Fort Moultrie in Charleston Harbor. Though many shots were fired by the British ships during the Battle of Sullivan's Island, those that hit the fortifications were absorbed by the soft palmetto logs that formed it; the American death toll was 12 against hundreds of British killed by the fort's gunfire. The lopped oak branch at the palmetto's base symbolizes the oaken British vessels. As Arlie Slabaugh Jr. put it in his volume on commemorative coins, "the South Carolinians had proven in 1776 that the palmetto was superior to the oak of Old England, and so it appears above the oak on this coin". The 13 stars surrounding the tree ostensibly symbolize the original American states, but may also have been intended to evoke the Confederate States of America. (Note: The Confederacy claimed 13 stars though it had only 11 states as it included stars for Missouri and Kentucky, which did not secede.) The name of the country, the coin's face value, and the mottos required by law appear on the reverse. Davidson's initials do not appear on the coin.

According to Carl Stang in his 2012 article on the Columbia half dollar, "the coin generally is nice looking in virtually any condition". Numismatic author Q. David Bowers stated, "The half dollar was attractive in its simplicity, and few numismatists—who certainly are inclined to voice opinions if they don't like things—felt moved to be critical." Art historian Cornelius Vermeule, in his volume on American coins and medals, writes, "The coin presents a weak combination of allegorical obverse and symbolic reverse, with disparate lettering, cramped on one side and spread out irregularly on the other." He deemed the obverse "badly proportioned" and the reverse "boring; it recalls the nineteenth-century primitivism of a Spanish colonial or newly-independent South American country's large denominations in silver, but lacks the spontaneity of those rugged pieces of eight. The Columbia half-dollar, of course, lacks the rough feeling of work in a screw press evoked by these coins."

== Distribution and collecting ==
The anniversary celebrations in Columbia took place between March 22 and 29, 1936. On May 30, Senator Byrnes wrote to Director Ross, asking on behalf of Hammond that the coins be struck at all three of the mints then open. He also requested that if this was not possible, that some of the coins be struck dated 1936 and some dated 1937. A subcommittee of the Senate Committee on Banking and Currency had held hearings on March 11, at which there had been testimony that commemoratives were being struck at multiple mints and in multiple years to increase the number of varieties a collector needed for a complete set, but the Columbia bill, signed into law only a week later, allowed for striking at multiple mints, and this had occurred by the end of September 1936. A total of 9,007 were struck at Philadelphia, 8,009 at Denver and 8,007 at San Francisco, with the excess over the even thousands held for examination and testing at the 1937 meeting of the annual Assay Commission. Although the Columbia piece was the first new commemorative authorized in 1936, it thus became the last to be struck. The coins were not distributed immediately, but orders were taken at $2.15 for a single coin, with a set of three for $6.45. By October 19, 1936, the issue was oversubscribed by 15,000 coins, likely representing quantities desired by coin dealers. At the start of December, the coins remained undistributed, causing some adverse comment in the numismatic community.

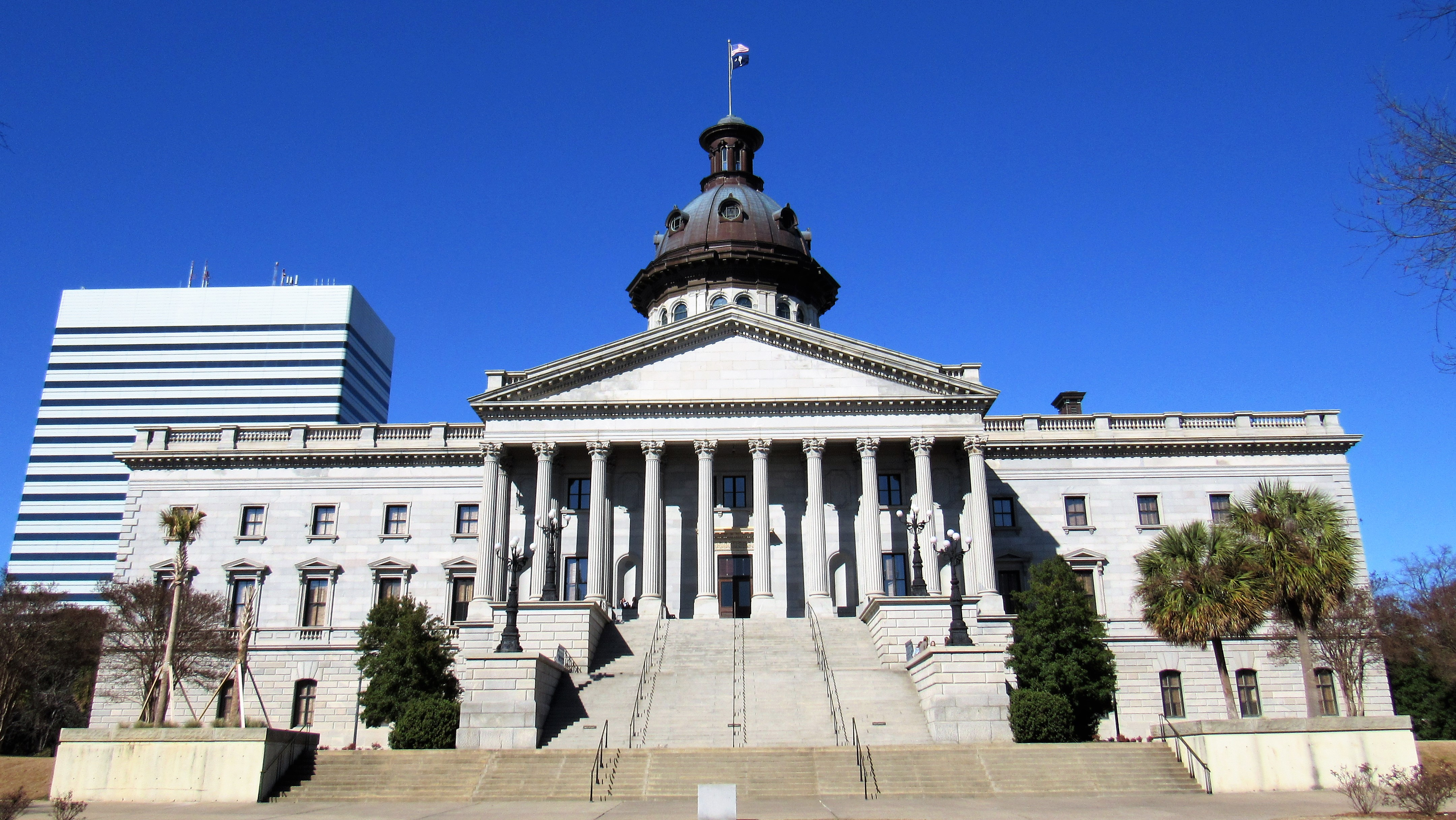
The South Carolina State House

To ensure a fair distribution of the coins, only small orders were filled. For the first 24 hours of sales, the coins were available only to residents of the city and thereafter could only be purchased by mail order. Local residents could buy them at $2 each. Dealers were unable to obtain large quantities, leading them to list the coins for sale in their advertisements without a sales price. David Bullowa, in his 1938 monograph on commemoratives, wrote, "The distribution was made by the commission on a very fair basis, and few persons were able to secure these coins in quantity. It made every endeavor to treat the collector fairly and to prevent the speculator from manipulating the prices of the sets in the open market, as had been done with many previous commemorative issues." Most orders for a single set of coins were filled. Some sets were held back for other purposes: one was presented to President Roosevelt in February 1937 and six sets were placed in a time capsule that was opened in 1986, when those coins were sold for several thousand dollars a set.

By 1940, the sets were selling for about $6 each on the secondary market, a price that increased to $10 by 1950 and to $100 by 1965. By 1980, they were $1,750 per set, a price that decreased thereafter. The deluxe edition of R. S. Yeoman's A Guide Book of United States Coins, published in 2020, lists the set for between $540 and $900, depending on condition, with individual pieces valued at a third of that. An exceptional specimen from the Denver Mint (1936–D) sold for $15,863 in 2019.
