= Iowa Award =

Civilian award

The Iowa Award is the highest civilian honor that can be bestowed in the state of Iowa. It was established in 1948 (following the state centennial anniversary in 1946) and is awarded roughly every five years by the Iowa Centennial Memorial Foundation.

== Recipients ==
Recipients by year of award are as follows:

- 1951 President Herbert Hoover
- 1955 Jay N. Darling
- 1961 Dr. Frank Spedding
- 1961 Dr. James Van Allen
- 1966 Vice President Henry A. Wallace
- 1970 First Lady Mamie Eisenhower
- 1975 Dr. Karl King
- 1978 Dr. Norman Borlaug
- 1980 Msgr. Luigi Liguitti
- 1984 George Gallup
- 1988 Meredith Willson
- 1992 Carrie Lane Chapman Catt
- 1996 Dr. Simon Estes
- 1999 Maurice Lasansky
- 1999 John Astanasoff
- 2001 John Ruan
- 2002 George Washington Carver
- 2005 Governor Robert D. Ray
- 2006 Harry Hopkins
- 2009 Grant Wood
- 2010 William C. Knapp
- 2012 Richard O. Jacobson
- 2014 Kenneth M. Quinn
- 2016 John Pappajohn
- 2018 Robert N. Noyce
- 2025 Governor Terry E. Branstad

== See also ==
- Iowa Centennial half dollar
