= Wayte Raymond =

American numismatist

Wayte Raymond (November 9, 1886–September 23, 1956) was a numismatist from the United States. He authored several numismatic books and catalogs and his Standard Catalog was considered the premier coin guide of its time. He was inducted into the Numismatic Hall of Fame in 1969. He is perhaps best known for his "boards" or albums designed to hold sets of coin series; for example, collectors could store the complete run of Flying Eagle and Indian Cent regular issues in a single 7.5-by-14-inch (190 mm × 360 mm) cardboard page with sliding plastic windows containing 70 slots for each date 1857–1909 and a couple notable varieties, such as the 1858 large- and small-letter varieties. These are the inception of millions of albums produced today for collectors.

== Publications by Raymond ==
- Coins of the World: 19th Century. New York.
- Coins of the World: 20th Century 1901–1950. Published by Raymond Wayte Incorporated, New York.
- The Silver Dollars of North and South America.

== References and notes ==
=== References ===
- Reiter, Ed (1999-12-27). "The Numismatist of the Century". Professional Coin Grading Service website. This article reviews significant contributors to numismatics in the United States.
