= Half dollar (United States coin) =

Denomination of United States currency

- United States
- Value: 0.50 U.S. dollar
- Mass: 11.340 g (0.365 troy oz)
- Diameter: 30.61 mm (1.205 in)
- Thickness: 2.15 mm (0.085 in)
- Edge: 150 reeds
- Composition: 1971–present: cupro-nickel (91.67% Cu, 8.33% Ni); 1965–1970: 60% copper, 40% silver; 1964: 90% silver, 10% copper
- Years of minting: 1794–1797, 1801–1803, 1805–1815, 1817–1921, 1923, 1927–1929, 1933–present
- Catalog number: –

Obverse
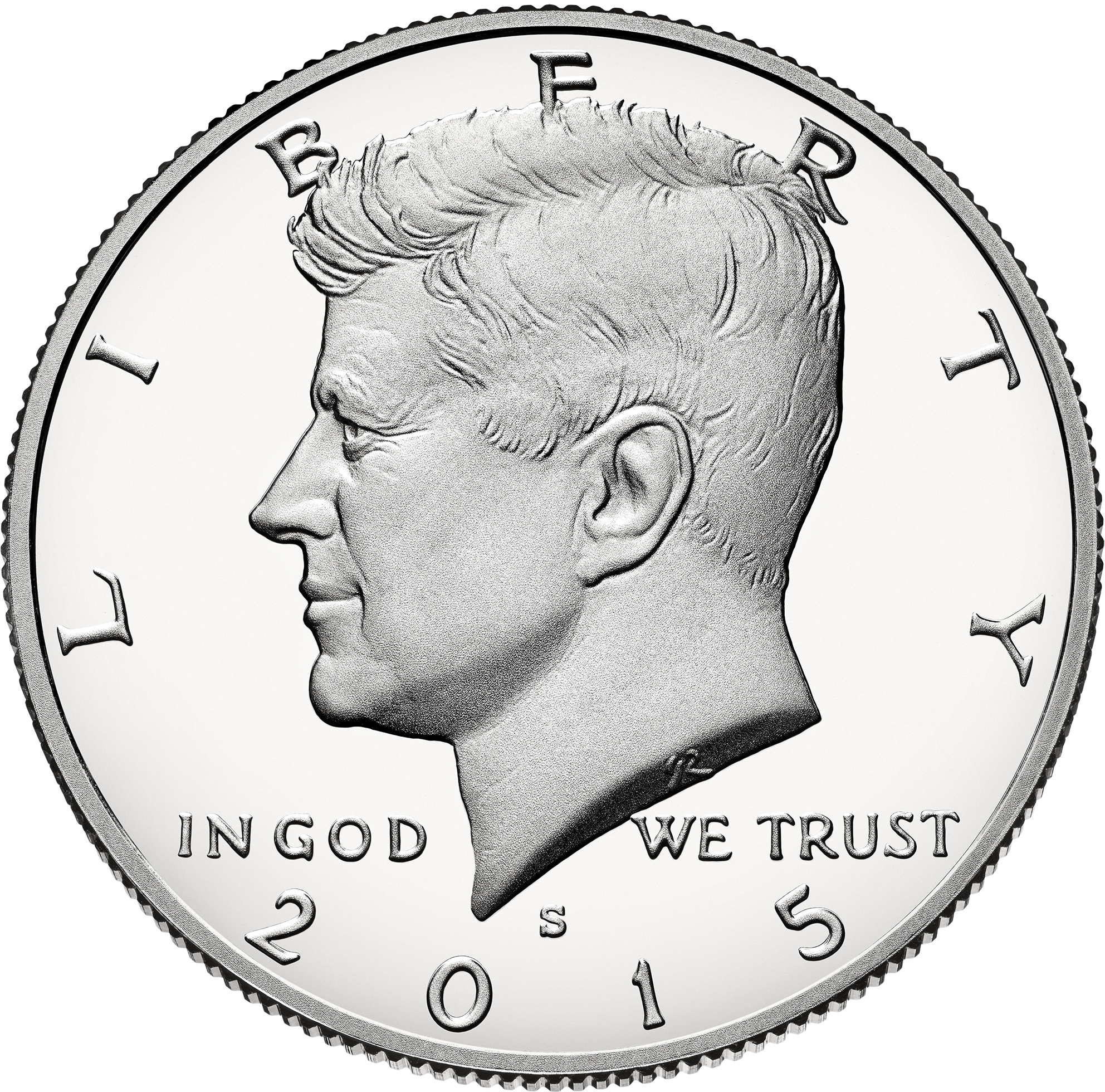
- Design: John F. Kennedy
- Designer: Gilroy Roberts
- Design date: 1964; 62 years ago

Reverse
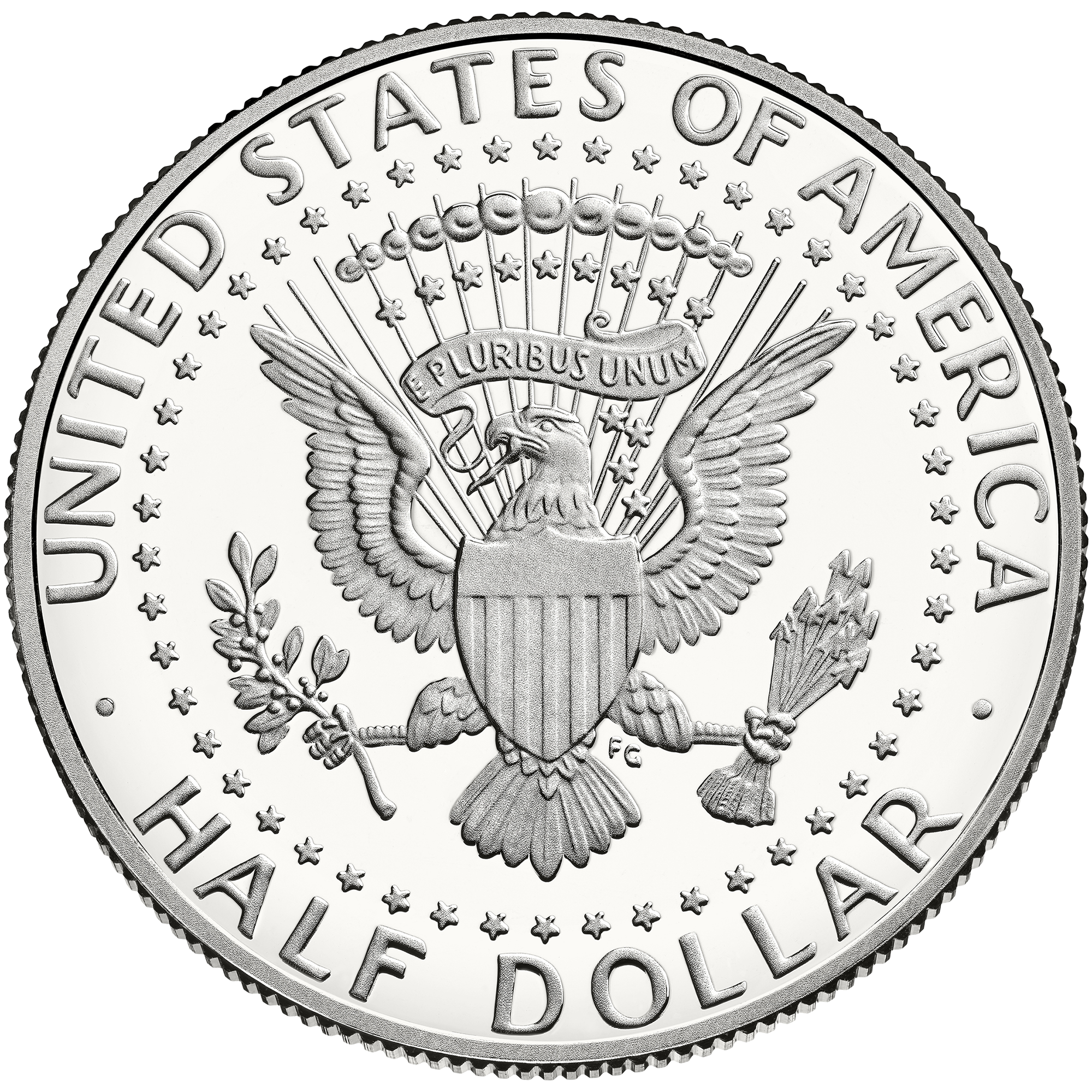
- Design: Presidential Seal
- Designer: Frank Gasparro
- Design date: 1964

The half dollar, sometimes referred to as the 50-cent coin, is a United States coin worth 50 cents, or ½ of a dollar ($0.50). In both size and weight, it is the largest circulating coin currently minted in the United States, being 1.205 inches (30.61 millimeters) in diameter and 0.085 in (2.16 mm) in thickness, and is twice the weight of the quarter. The coin's design has undergone a number of changes throughout its history. Since 1964, the half dollar depicts the profile of President John F. Kennedy on the obverse and the seal of the president of the United States on the reverse.

Although seldom used today, half-dollar coins were common in circulation until the 1970s and were regularly used alongside other denominations of US coinage. Half-dollars have since become uncommon in circulation for several reasons. The coins were produced in fairly large quantities until 2002, when the U.S. Mint reduced production of the half and ceased minting them for general circulation. As a result of its decreasing usage, many pre-2002 half dollars remain in Federal Reserve vaults, prompting the change in production.

Collector half dollars are still minted and sold by the U.S. Mint, and circulated half dollars minted from 1971 to 2001 can be found at American banks and credit unions. Beginning in 2021, half dollars were again produced for general circulation. Modern half dollars are composed of cupro-nickel, but they contained 40% silver from 1965–1970, and those minted in 1964 contained 90% silver and 10% copper, just as did dimes and quarters made that year.

== Circulation ==
Half-dollar coins saw heavy circulation until the mid 1960s. For many years, they were (and in many areas still are) commonly used by gamblers at casinos and other venues with slot machines. Rolls of half dollars may still be kept on hand in cardrooms for games requiring 50-cent antes or bring-in bets, for dealers to pay winning naturals in blackjack, or where the house collects a rake in increments. Additionally, some concession vendors at sporting events distribute half-dollar coins as change for convenience.

By the early 1960s, the rising price of silver neared the point where the bullion value of U.S. silver coins would exceed face value. In 1965, the U.S. introduced layered-composition coins made of a pure copper core sandwiched between two cupronickel outer faces. The silver content of dimes and quarters was eliminated, but the Kennedy half-dollar, introduced in 1964, contained silver. The silver content was reduced from 90% in 1964, to 40% from 1965 to 1970.

Even with its reduced silver content, the half dollar attracted widespread interest from speculators and coin collectors, which led to extensive hoarding of half dollars dated 1970 and earlier. In 1971, the composition of the half was changed to match that of the clad dimes and quarters, and with an increase in production, the coin saw a moderate increase in usage. By this time many businesses and the public had begun to lose interest in the half dollar and gradually, its usage began to wane. By the end of the 1970s, the half dollar had become uncommon in circulation. Merchants stopped ordering half dollars from their banks, and many banks stopped ordering half dollars from the Federal Reserve, and the U.S. mints sharply reduced production of the coins.

From 2001 to 2020, half dollars were minted only for collectors, due to large Federal Reserve and government inventories of pre-2001 coins; this was primarily due to a lack of demand and large quantity returns of halves from casinos that switched to using "coin-less" slot machines. Eventually, the reserve supply of halves began to run low and in 2021, the mint resumed production of half dollars for general circulation.

Modern-date half dollars can be purchased in proof sets, mint sets, rolls, and bags from the U.S. Mint, and existing inventory circulation pieces can be obtained or ordered through most U.S. banks and credit unions. All collector issues since 2001 have had much lower mintages than in previous years. Although intended only for collectors, 2001-2020 half dollars can often be found in circulation.

== Aspects of early history ==
On December 1, 1794, the first half dollars, approximately 5,300 pieces, were delivered. Another 18,000 were produced in January 1795 using dies of 1794, to save the expense of making new ones. Another 30,000 pieces were struck by the end of 1801. The coin had the Heraldic Eagle, based on the Great Seal of the United States on the reverse. 150,000 were minted in 1804 but struck with dies from 1803, so no 1804 specimens exist, though there were some pieces dated 1805 that carried a "5 over 4" overdate.

In 1838, half-dollar dies were produced in the Philadelphia Mint for the newly established New Orleans Mint, and ten test samples of the 1838 half dollars were made at the main Philadelphia mint. These samples were put into the mint safe along with other rarities like the 1804 silver dollar. The dies were then shipped to New Orleans for the regular production of 1838 half dollars. New Orleans production of the half dollars was delayed due to the priority of producing half dimes and dimes. The large press for half-dollar production was not used in New Orleans until January 1839 to produce 1838 half dollars, but the reverse die could not be properly secured, and only ten samples were produced before the dies failed. Rufus Tyler, chief coiner of the New Orleans mint, wrote to Mint Director Patterson of the problem on February 25, 1839.

The Orleans mint samples all had a double stamped reverse as a result of this production problem and they also showed dramatic signs of die rust, neither of which are present on the Philadelphia produced test samples. While eight Philadelphia minted samples survive to this day, there is only one known New Orleans minted specimen with the tell-tale double stamped reverse and die rust. This is the famous coin that Rufus Tyler presented to Alexander Dallas Bache, great grandson of Benjamin Franklin, in the summer of 1839 and was later purchased in June 1894 by A. G. Heaton, the father of mint mark coin collecting. The 1838 Philadelphia-produced half dollars are extremely rare, with two separate specimens having sold for $632,500 in Heritage auctions in 2005 and 2008 respectively. The sole surviving Orleans minted 1838 is one of the rarest of all American coins. In 1840, this mint produced nearly 180,000 half dollars.

In 1861, the New Orleans mint produced coins for three different governments. A total of 330,000 were struck under the United States government, 1,240,000 for the State of Louisiana after it seceded from the Union, and 962,633 after it joined the Confederacy. Since the same die was used for all strikings, the output looks identical. The Confederate States of America minted four half dollars with a CSA, rather than USA reverse. In the obverse die they used had a small die crack. Thus "regular" 1861 half dollars with this crack probably were used by the Confederates for some of the mass striking.

There are two varieties of Kennedy half dollars in the proof set issues of 1964. Initially, the die was used with accented hair, showing deeper lines than the president's widow, Jacqueline Kennedy, preferred. New dies were prepared to smooth out some of the details. It is estimated that about 1 to 3% (40,000 to 100,000) of the proof halves are of the earlier type, making them somewhat more expensive for collectors.

In 2026 half dollars have a new circulating commemorative design as part of the United States Semiquincentennial coinage series, part of the observance of the 250th anniversary of American independence. This new design features the Statue of Liberty on the obverse, with her torch being passed from one generation to the next on the reverse.

== List of designs ==
Silver half dollars

- Flowing Hair 1794–1795
- Draped Bust 1796–1807
  - Draped Bust, Small Eagle 1796–1797
  - Draped Bust, Heraldic Eagle 1801–1807
- Capped Bust 1807–1839
  - Capped Bust (Large Size), With Motto 1807–1836
  - Capped Bust (Small Size), No Motto 1836–1839
- Seated Liberty 1839–1891
  - Seated Liberty, No Motto 1839–1866
  - Seated Liberty, With Motto 1866–1891
- Barber 1892–1915
- Walking Liberty 1916–1947
- Franklin 1948–1963
- Kennedy 1964 (General circulation issue) (the last 90% silver half dollar for circulation, contains 0.36169 oz. net silver per coin, or 7.234 oz. silver per roll)
- Kennedy 1992–present (silver proof sets available; 90% silver until 2019, 99.9% since)

40% silver half dollars

- Kennedy 1965–1970
- Kennedy 1976 (only collectors sets produced with 40% silver)

Copper-nickel clad half dollars

- Kennedy 1971–1974, 1977–present
- Kennedy Bicentennial 1975–1976 (all dated 1776–1976)
- Enduring Liberty Semiquincentennial 2026

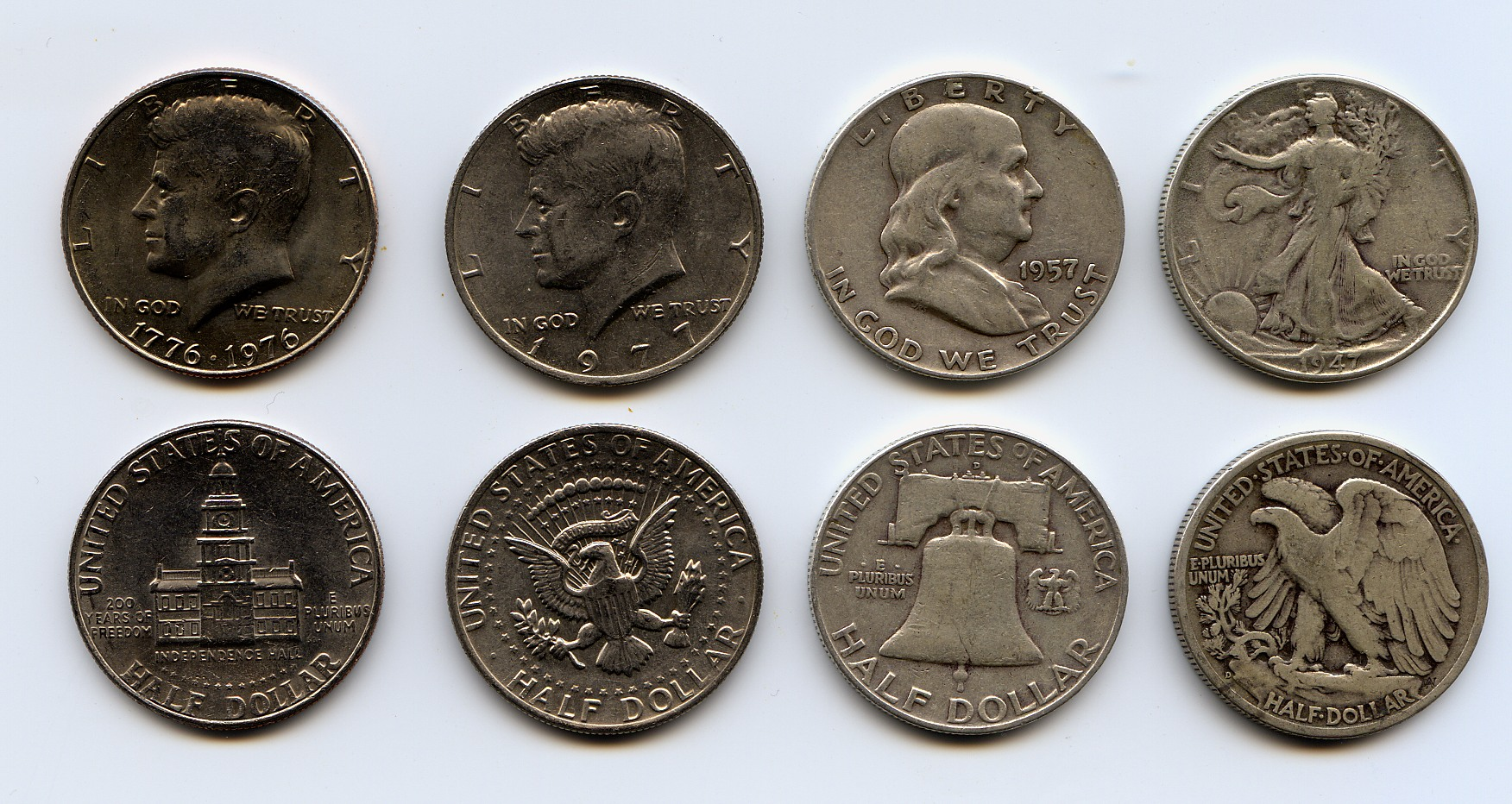
Various half dollar designs. From left to right: Bicentennial, Kennedy, Franklin, Walking Liberty

== List of early commemorative issues ==
- Columbian half dollar (1892–1893)
- Panama–Pacific half dollar (1915)
- Illinois Centennial half dollar (1918)
- Maine Centennial half dollar (1920)
- Pilgrim Tercentenary half dollar (1920–1921)
- Missouri Centennial half dollar (1921)
- Alabama Centennial half dollar (1921)
- Grant Memorial half dollar (1922)
- Monroe Doctrine Centennial half dollar (1923)
- Huguenot-Walloon half dollar (1924)
- Lexington-Concord Sesquicentennial half dollar (1925)
- Stone Mountain Memorial half dollar (1925)
- California Diamond Jubilee half dollar (1925)
- Fort Vancouver Centennial half dollar (1925)
- United States Sesquicentennial half dollar (1926)
- Oregon Trail Memorial half dollar (1926–1939)
- Vermont Sesquicentennial half dollar (1927)
- Hawaii Sesquicentennial half dollar (1928)
- Maryland Tercentenary half dollar (1934)
- Texas Centennial half dollar (1934–1938)
- Daniel Boone Bicentennial half dollar (1934–1938)
- Connecticut Tercentenary half dollar (1935)
- Arkansas Centennial half dollar (1935–1939)
- Arkansas–Robinson half dollar (1936)
- Hudson Sesquicentennial half dollar (1935)
- California Pacific International Exposition half dollar (1935–1936)
- Old Spanish Trail half dollar (1935)
- Rhode Island Tercentenary half dollar (1936)
- Cleveland Centennial half dollar (1936)
- Wisconsin Territorial Centennial half dollar (1936)
- Cincinnati Musical Center half dollar (1936)
- Long Island Tercentenary half dollar (1936)
- York County, Maine Tercentenary half dollar (1936)
- Bridgeport, Connecticut Centennial half dollar (1936)
- Lynchburg Sesquicentennial half dollar (1936)
- Elgin, Illinois, Centennial half dollar (1936)
- Albany Charter half dollar (1936)
- San Francisco–Oakland Bay Bridge half dollar (1936)
- Columbia, South Carolina Sesquicentennial half dollar (1936)
- Delaware Tercentenary half dollar (1936)
- Battle of Gettysburg half dollar (1936)
- Norfolk, Virginia, Bicentennial half dollar (1936)
- Roanoke Island half dollar (1937)
- Battle of Antietam half dollar (1937)
- New Rochelle 250th Anniversary half dollar (1938)
- Iowa Centennial half dollar (1946)
- Booker T. Washington Memorial half dollar (1946–1951)
- Carver-Washington half dollar (1951–1954)

== See also ==
- United States Mint coin production
- 1814 platinum half dollar
