= Charles Moore (city planner) =

American journalist, historian and city planner

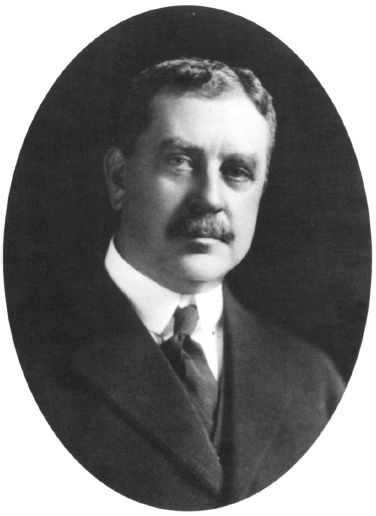
Charles Moore

Charles Moore (1855-1942) was an American journalist, historian and city planner.

== Early life ==
He was born in Ypsilanti, Michigan, west of Detroit. He attended Phillips Academy Andover in Massachusetts and Harvard College (now University), where he studied under Charles Eliot Norton, Harvard’s first professor of art history. Norton emphasized the moral value of art and the equivalence of architecture with the other arts, and these ideas provided a lasting inspiration for Moore. During his college years Moore was editor of the Harvard Crimson and also wrote weekly columns for a couple of Detroit papers.

== Early career ==
After graduation from Harvard in 1878, Moore spent ten years as a journalist in Detroit, eventually becoming Washington correspondent for the Detroit Evening Journal. He became acquainted with Detroit businessman and Republican politician James McMillan, and when McMillan was elected to the U.S. Senate in 1889, Moore accompanied him to Washington as his personal secretary. McMillan was appointed chairman of the Senate Committee on the District of Columbia and, as clerk, Moore drafted many committee reports outlining progressive policies to improve utilities, social services, transportation, and recreation in the city. In 1900 Moore completed a Ph.D. in history at Columbian College (now George Washington University).

== McMillan Commission ==
In 1901, Moore played a key role in securing passage of a bill to establish the Senate Park Commission, also known as the McMillan Commission, convened to formulate a plan for the future growth of Washington that would recapture the aims of the 1791 L'Enfant Plan for the city and create a monumental appearance for the National Mall. The commission was composed of four men—architects Daniel Burnham and Charles Follen McKim, sculptor Augustus Saint-Gaudens, and landscape architect Frederick Law Olmsted Jr.—all of whom had been intimately involved with the 1893 World’s Columbian Exposition, in Chicago. The fair’s classical buildings embodied the ideals of the City Beautiful movement, a revival of classical architecture in the Victorian era as a means of encouraging civic betterment through unified groupings of buildings that integrated typically allegorical sculpture, painting, and landscape with architecture. Burnham had been the fair’s director and was currently president of the American Institute of Architects. Moore served as the McMillan Commission’s secretary, and in the summer of 1901 accompanied the commission on a seven-week visit to European cities and estates that had influenced the L'Enfant Plan. With Olmsted, he wrote the 1901 Report of the Senate Park Commission, also known as the McMillan Report or McMillan Plan, still used as a template for the growth of Washington’s central area. Moore promoted adoption of the plan as the legitimate successor to the L'Enfant Plan, sharing its principles concerning the reciprocal relation of key sites and the need for an overall unity. Moore believed deeply in the symbolic importance of Washington as the capital of the nation.

James McMillan died in 1902 and Moore returned to Michigan the next year. He worked for more than a decade in various banks and businesses in Detroit and Boston.

== U.S. Commission of Fine Arts ==
In 1910, he was a founding member of the Commission of Fine Arts (CFA), in Washington, a presidentially appointed federal commission of seven nationally recognized experts on the arts and architecture charged with overseeing design on federal property in the city; Moore remained a member for almost 30 years, serving as chairman from 1915 to 1937. The first major project reviewed by the CFA was the Lincoln Memorial, which anchored the western end of the Mall and established its central design theme of national unity. During Moore’s tenure the commission reviewed the design of the U.S. Supreme Court, the extension of the U.S. Capitol Grounds, the Federal Triangle complex, and the redesign of the Mall as a tree-lined greensward creating an unbroken vista between the U.S. Capitol and the Washington Monument. Through skillful maneuvers, Moore ensured that the route of Arlington Memorial Bridge ran between the Lincoln Memorial and Arlington National Cemetery. As CFA chairman in the 1930s, Moore witnessed the gradual waning of historically based classicism and its replacement by a historic modernism. After an epic battle over the appropriate form of the national memorial to Thomas Jefferson, Moore resigned his chairmanship in September 1937 and retired to a son’s home in Washington state, where he died in 1942 at the age of 86.

== Other accomplishments ==
In addition to his work with the CFA, Moore also served as director of the Detroit Museum of Art (1914–17) and as acting chief of the Manuscripts Division of the Library of Congress (1918–27). For the library, he acquired the papers of notable Americans, including Presidents Theodore Roosevelt and William Howard Taft. Moore was the author of numerous essays, articles, and histories, many related to city planning and architecture, and biographies of Daniel Burnham, Charles McKim, and George Washington. He was active in the restoration of Wakefield, George Washington’s birthplace in Virginia, and other activities marking the 1932 centennial of Washington’s birth.

== Associations ==
Moore was a member of the American Academy in Rome, the National Conference on City Planning, the American Institute of Arts and Letters, and the Detroit City Plan and Improvement Commission, as well as the New York Architectural League and the Michigan Historical Commission. Affable and politically adroit, Moore was a friend of presidents, including McKinley and Coolidge, and was skilled at working behind the scenes to gather support for the CFA’s planning goals. Moore was a member of many private clubs, including the Cosmos Club in Washington and the Century Club in New York. During his long career he received numerous awards and honors, including honorary membership in the American Institute of Architects and the American Society of Landscape Architects, and he was named a Chevalier of the French Legion of Honor in 1924. He was married to Alice Williams Merriam from 1878 until her death in 1914. They had two sons.

== Charles Moore, Publications ==
"The Northwest under Three Flags" (1900)
"Report of the Senate Park Commission" (1901)
"Report on the Restoration of the White House" (1902)
"History of Michigan" (1915)
Editor, "Plan of Chicago", by Daniel H. Burnham and Edward H. Bennett (1919)
"A Life of Daniel H. Burnham, Architect and Planner of Cities" (2 vols.; 1921)
"The Family Life of George Washington" (1926)
"Life and Letters of Charles Follen McKim" (1929)
"Washington Past and Present" (1929)
"Wakefield, Birthplace of George Washington" (1932)

== Footnotes ==
Burnham Kelly, biographical statement, 1979, vertical files, U.S. Commission of Fine Arts.

Thomas E. Luebke, ed. “Civic Art: A Centennial History of the U.S. Commission of Fine Arts” (Washington, D.C.: U.S. Commission of Fine Arts, 2013): Appendix B.

“Who’s Who in America,” 1978.
