= Vermont Sesquicentennial half dollar =

1927 American commemorative fifty-cent piece

- United States
- Value: 50 cents (0.50 US dollars)
- Mass: 12.5 g
- Diameter: 30.61 mm (1.20 in)
- Thickness: 2.15 mm (0.08 in)
- Edge: Reeded
- Composition: 90.0% silver; 10.0% copper
- Silver: 0.36169 troy oz
- Years of minting: 1927
- Mintage: 40,034 including 34 pieces for the Assay Commission (11,892 melted)
- Mint marks: None, all pieces struck at the Philadelphia Mint without mint mark

Obverse
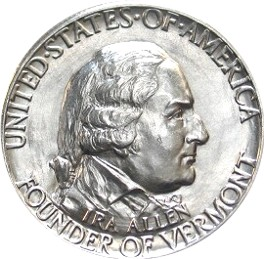
- Design: Ira Allen
- Designer: Charles Keck
- Design date: 1927

Reverse
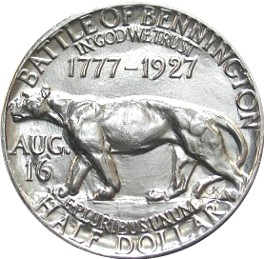
- Design: Catamount
- Designer: Charles Keck
- Design date: 1927

The Vermont Sesquicentennial half dollar, sometimes called the Bennington–Vermont half dollar or the Battle of Bennington Sesquicentennial half dollar, is a commemorative fifty-cent piece struck by the United States Bureau of the Mint in 1927. The coin was designed by Charles Keck, and on its obverse depicts early Vermont leader Ira Allen, brother of Ethan Allen.

On January 9, 1925, Vermont Senator Frank Greene introduced legislation for commemorative coins to mark the 150th anniversary of Vermont declaring itself fully independent in 1777 and of the American victory at the Battle of Bennington the same year. His bill passed the Senate without difficulty, but in the House of Representatives faced an array of problems. Treasury Secretary Andrew W. Mellon sent a letter opposing the bill and dispatched three Treasury officials to testify against it, arguing that the public was being confused as special coin issues entered circulation. The committee's resolve to have no more commemorative coins—after this one—did not impress the full House, which added two more half dollars to the legislation to mark other anniversaries. The Senate agreed to the changes, and President Calvin Coolidge signed the authorizing act on February 24, 1925.

There was a lengthy battle over the design between the Commission of Fine Arts and the Vermont commission in charge of organizing the coin issue, as a result of which the original designer, Sherry Fry, left the project, replaced by Keck. Although the eventual reverse design of a catamount satisfied the Fine Arts Commission, it has been severely criticized by later writers. The coins did not sell out; over a fourth of the issue was returned for redemption and melting. The coins sell for at least in the hundreds of dollars today, depending on condition.

== Background ==
In the days before the American Revolutionary War, the ownership of what is now the state of Vermont was uncertain. New Hampshire claimed it, deeming its own western boundary to be 20 miles (32 km) east of the Hudson River; the colony of New York believed it owned the territory north of Massachusetts east to the Connecticut River. British authorities awarded the land to New York in 1764, but settlers felt more affinity with New Hampshire, from which they had secured land grants. When New York issued grants for the same real estate, there was conflict between the two groups of settlers, and those deriving title from New Hampshire organized the Green Mountain Boys, a local militia. At first, the Boys concentrated on fending off unwanted settlers from New York, but after the war began in 1775, they turned their attention to the British.

Brothers Ira and Ethan Allen were born in Connecticut, and were leaders of the Green Mountain Boys. Ethan Allen led an ill-advised raid on Montreal in 1775, was captured, and spent the remainder of the Revolutionary War a prisoner of the British. Ira Allen, besides being a military leader, was a member of the convention that declared Vermont independent in January 1777. A key player in Vermont politics in the Revolutionary War years, Allen served as state treasurer, designed the great seal, and in the 1780s surveyed several towns, three of which are named for him: Ira, Irasburg and Alburg, Vermont, the last likely a shortened form of "Allenburgh". In 1791, the year Vermont was admitted to the Union, he was the principal founder of the University of Vermont, the first university in what is now the United States to have a religious nondiscrimination policy. Thereafter his fortunes declined: he went to France in 1796 to buy weapons for the state militia, but his ship and cargo were taken by the British. He returned to Vermont to find his land seized for taxes, and was put in jail in Burlington for debt. He fled to Philadelphia, where he hoped to reverse his fortunes but was unable to; he died there impoverished in 1814.

In 1777, the British general, John Burgoyne, advanced south from Canada, hoping to divide the colonies by capturing the Hudson Valley in what is called the Saratoga Campaign. Low on supplies, he heard of a poorly-guarded American depot at what is now Bennington, Vermont, and sent part of his force to secure it. Vermonters were joined by some 1,500 New Hampshire militiamen, and on August 16, 1777, the Battle of Bennington took place. About 200 of the British forces were killed and 700 taken prisoner; only 40 Americans were killed. Weakened by the losses and the failure to obtain supplies, Burgoyne was defeated at the Battle of Saratoga in New York state that October, an American victory that historian Edmund Morgan deemed "a great turning point of the war, because it won for Americans the foreign assistance [from France] which was the last element needed for victory".

== Legislation ==
Legislation for a silver fifty-cent piece and a gold one-dollar piece in commemoration of the 150th anniversaries of the Battle of Bennington and of the independence of Vermont was introduced in the Senate by that state's Frank Greene on January 9, 1925. Greene had not always been a friend to commemorative coins: when the Monroe Doctrine Centennial half dollar was debated in 1922, he commented, "the question is whether the United States Government is going to go on from year to year submitting its coinage to this—well—harlotry." His bill was referred to the Committee on Banking and Currency. Greene, a member of that committee, reported the bill back to the Senate on January 20, with an amendment and a recommendation that it pass. The amendment deleted the proposed one-dollar piece and increased the mintage of the half dollar from 20,000 to 40,000. On January 24, New Hampshire's George H. Moses, acting on Greene's behalf, moved that the Senate consider the bill, and it passed that body without opposition.

After the House received the Senate-passed bill, it was referred to the Committee on Coinage, Weights, and Measures, which held hearings on January 30, with the chairman, Indiana Representative Albert H. Vestal, presiding. He introduced into the record a letter from Treasury Secretary Andrew W. Mellon, opposing the measure. Mellon noted that many commemorative issues had failed to sell out, leaving coins in the Mint or returning them for melting. Mellon felt that the public was being confused as surplus commemoratives entered circulation. The Treasury had sent three officials, Mint Director Robert J. Grant, Assistant Director Mary M. O'Reilly and Garrard B. Winston, the assistant to the Undersecretary of the Treasury. O'Reilly, who had been with the Treasury longer than the other two, addressed the committee, warning that there were six coinage bills before Congress, and that the Mint had struck nine commemoratives in the past five years. She answered questions from the congressmen on the panel.

Vermont Representative Frederick G. Fleetwood addressed the committee. O'Reilly had indicated that coins were being requested for local celebrations, and Fleetwood stressed the importance in American history of the events that were being commemorated. Vestal and others supported a ban on the committee passing further commemorative coin bills, but wanted the Vermont bill to pass. For one thing, as Massachusetts' Robert M. Leach noted, President Calvin Coolidge was a Vermonter by birth. The Treasury officials were willing to support striking a medal rather than a coin, but as Illinois' Morton D. Hull pointed out, the sellers preferred a coin that could be spent if there was an unsold surplus, over a medal that could not. Leach's attitude toward approving more commemorative coins was typical: "I believe we have been going too fast, and I believe at some time we ought to quit it, but I dislike quitting on these gentlemen representing the State of Vermont this morning." Vestal issued a report the same day, stating that the committee was against more commemorative coin issues, but that the Bennington issue should pass because of the national importance of the events of 1777, and because the issue of 40,000 was relatively small.

The bill came to the floor of the House of Representatives on February 16. As soon as the bill was read, California Representative John E. Raker pressed an amendment to provide for a California Diamond Jubilee half dollar. He explained that Senator Samuel Shortridge had gotten a bill through the Senate that was nearly identical to his amendment, and "the Senator is exceptionally anxious that it go through." Vestal asked to be heard in opposition to the amendment, stating that his committee, after recommending the Bennington bill, had decided to promote no further coin bills. He added that because of this, Washington Representative Albert Johnson had agreed to withdraw his bill for a commemorative honoring the centennial of Fort Vancouver, in his state. The Minority Leader, Democratic Congressman Finis J. Garrett of Tennessee, asked why the committee had not set the rule before considering the Bennington bill, and Vestal admitted that was hard to answer. The House voted, and the California amendment was added. But Representative Johnson to applause from his colleagues moved a further amendment, to add "and Vancouver, Wash." (that is, the state of Washington) The amendment passed, as did the bill. Johnson realized that such a simple amendment might not result in a coin being issued, and returned to the House floor soon thereafter, asking that the bill be reconsidered, so he could couch his amendment in the same phrasing as for the other two coins. Once the bill was again being considered, Johnson added his amendment, but Vestal moved that the bill be returned to his committee. His motion failed, 24 ayes to 67 noes. Lengthy procedural wrangling followed over whether that vote could be objected to because there was no quorum present. Once this was resolved, the House passed the bill again. The bill was returned to the Senate the following day. Kansas' Charles Curtis moved on behalf of Greene that the Senate agree to the House amendments, and the bill, authorizing all three coins, was enacted by Coolidge's signature on February 24, 1925. Anthony Swiatek and Walter Breen, in their 1988 book on commemoratives, state that the bill would probably not have passed Congress if Coolidge had not been known to have an interest in the Bennington observances.

== Preparation ==
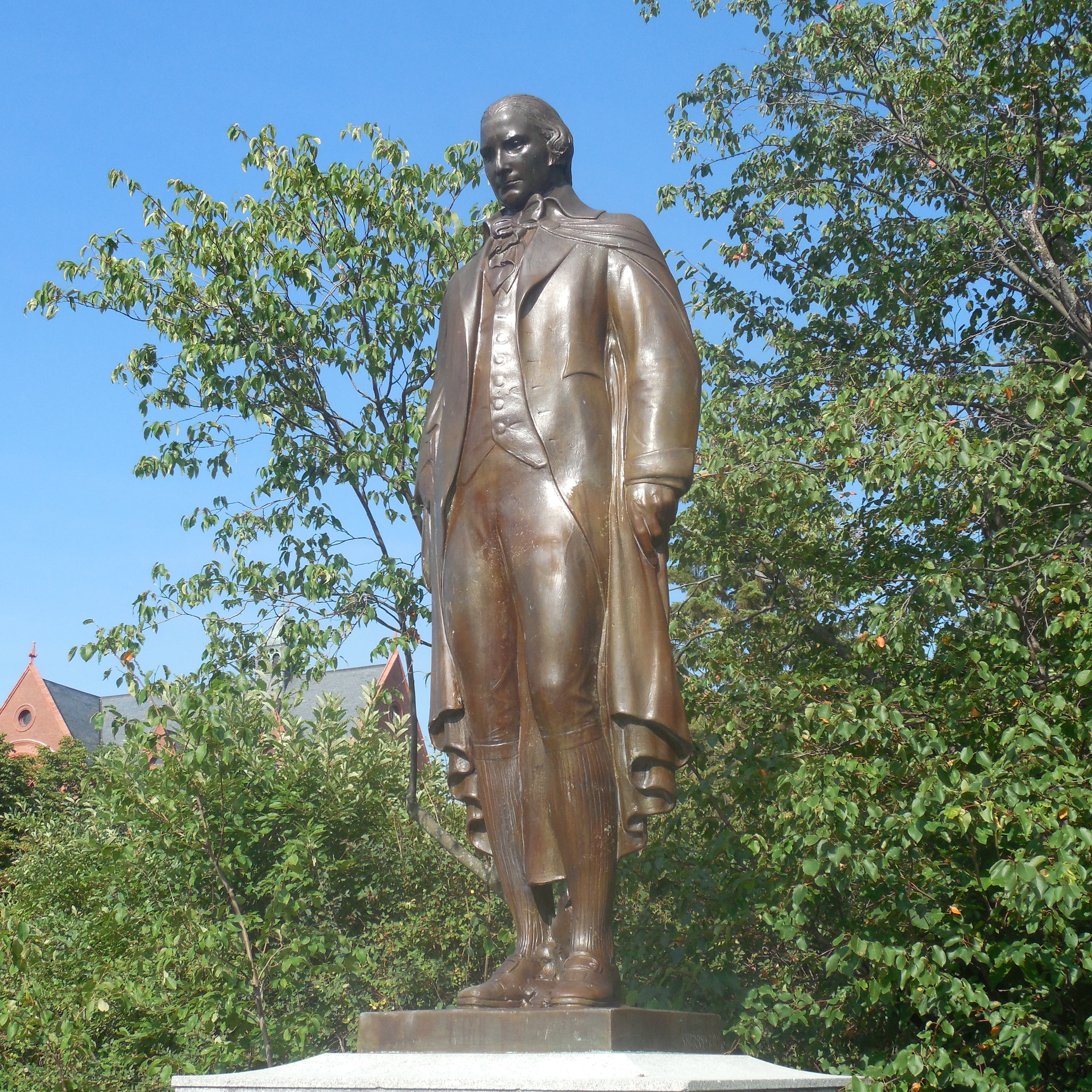
Statue of Ira Allen by Sherry Fry (1921)

After the approval of the legislation, the Vermont Sesquicentennial Commission moved quickly to secure designs to be used for the half dollar. Members decided to have the coin show Ira Allen on the obverse, and the Battle of Bennington Monument on the reverse. They commissioned Sherry Fry, who had created a statue of Allen for the University of Vermont, to design the coin. On July 1, 1925, Fry wrote to Charles Moore, chairman of the Commission of Fine Arts (charged by a 1921 executive order by President Warren G. Harding with rendering advisory opinions on public artworks, including coins), informing him that the models would be ready in about a week.

Louis Ayres, a member of the Fine Arts Commission, and James Earle Fraser, a former member, viewed the models before they were sent, and did not approve of them. Ayres wrote to Moore on July 15, stating that the designs were mediocre, but that it was not entirely Fry's fault, as the Sesquicentennial Commission had dictated the designs. Moore wrote to Mint Director Grant on the 18th, noting the problem, and relaying a suggestion from Ayres, that sketches be approved by the Mint before the artist spent time and effort on making plaster models, and that Fry be allowed to make designs of his own choosing. In spite of this, Fry formally submitted photographs of his models on August 9. Once the Mint had established that Fry had the authority to act, O'Reilly sent them to the Fine Arts Commission for its verdict. On September 5, Moore replied, rejecting the models on several grounds. The Fine Arts Commission questioned the choice of Allen, did not like the lettering, objected to the misspelling of Bennington as "Bennigton", and had mistaken the monument for the one erected for the Battle of Lake Champlain, and thus felt that there was an issue regarding relevance. On September 11, the chairman of the Sesquicentennial Commission, John Spargo, wrote to Grant, pointing out the error and strongly defending the choices of Allen and the monument. He wrote again on the 15th, this time directly to Moore, "your commission has touched the pride of the Vermonter there, with a rather rough hand."

Moore wrote to Spargo on September 18, stating that his commission had approved the head of Allen but was dissatisfied with the lettering. Spargo had mentioned that President Coolidge liked the Bennington Monument, and Moore stated that the Fine Arts Commission was anxious to get right a coin for the president's state of birth; Fry, he wrote, had the talent to design a handsome coin, but had not done so. The next day, Spargo replied, hopeful that they would soon resolve the dispute. He stated that the Sesquicentennial Commission felt that designs other than the monument would not do; for example, the use of a Green Mountain Boy would both require stretching history and risk charges of imitating the Minuteman seen on the Lexington-Concord Sesquicentennial half dollar, issued earlier in 1925. He was also unwilling to have a two-headed coin, as such a design combined with the depiction of Allen would be. Spargo suggested that Moore put his objections in writing and be as clear as possible to induce Fry to continue with the project, because the sculptor wanted to withdraw from it. Despite conciliatory efforts, Fry refused to continue, and after the failure of brief negotiations with Theodore Spicer-Simson, the Vermont commission engaged Charles Keck.

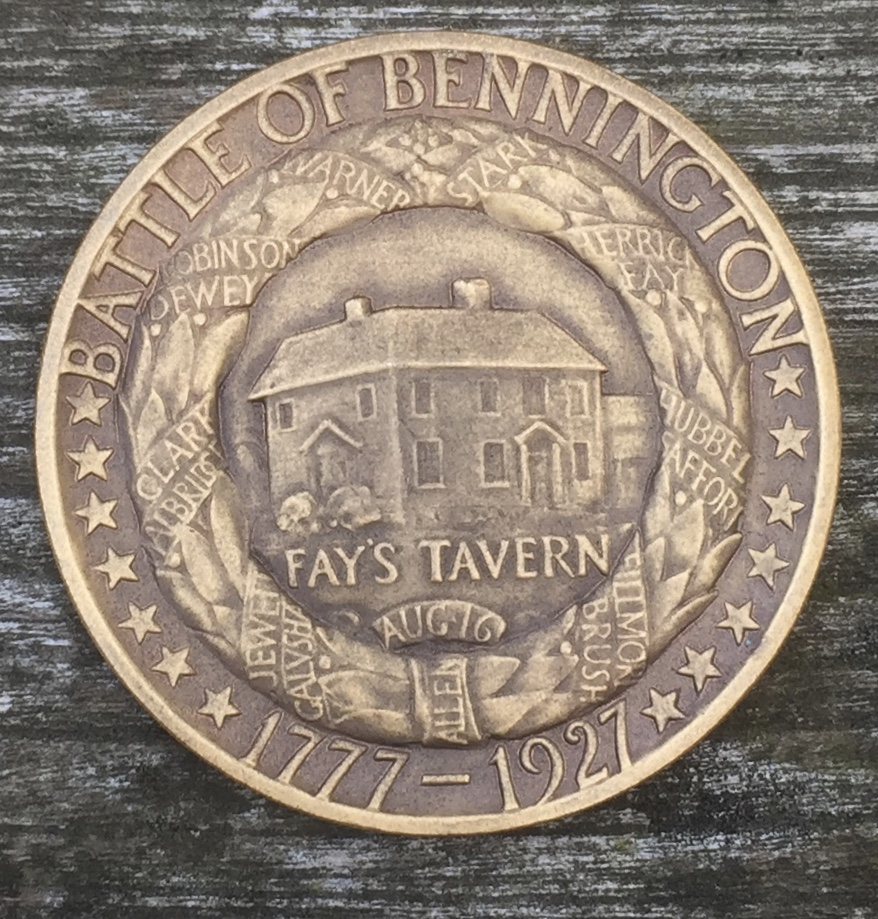
Keck repurposed his rejected design for the half dollar as one side of the official medal.

It was not until March 24, 1926, that new models, by Keck, were sent to the Fine Arts Commission. Although the commission admired Keck's portrait of Allen, they disliked his choice of Fay's Tavern for the reverse, and also disliked his enclosing the building in a wreath. On April 2, Moore wrote to Keck, advising him to get rid of both, and to put in place of the building a catamount, which would make a coin one could admire. The animal is a reference to Fay's Tavern, that was also known as the Catamount Tavern, and was a place where the Green Mountain Boys met. A copy of the letter was sent by Keck to Spargo, who wrote to Moore on the 12th, suggesting the Fine Arts Commission was overstepping its bounds by trying to dictate the design, but to resolve the matter, he would agree to the catamount: "Life is too short to be spent in futile argument with the Commission of Fine Arts."

By the end April 1926, Keck had prepared three models, two with the catamount and a third featuring Revolutionary War memorabilia. The commission on the 30th approved one showing a walking catamount for the reverse, and asked that the words FOUNDER OF VERMONT be removed and IRA ALLEN be substituted. The Vermont commission objected, and the matter was resolved by the name being added. E PLURIBUS UNUM and IN GOD WE TRUST also had to be added to the reverse; Keck promised completion within several days when he wrote to Grant on May 24, with photographs to be submitted to Secretary Mellon for final approval. In July, Spargo wrote to Grant, advising him of how the coins would be distributed and making arrangements to secure the first coins struck, to be used for presentations. The Medallic Art Company of New York reduced Keck's plaster models to coin-sized hubs from which dies could be made by the Philadelphia Mint.

== Design ==
Sometimes the Commission of Fine Arts was careless in approving models for commemorative coins, almost as if they were tired of the subject and wanted to get them off their hands. At other times they were tedious, or "up tight" as one might describe it nowadays, and were determined to make the design conform to their ideas regardless of what the commission sponsoring the coin wanted. The Vermont coin is one of the latter examples. But the Battle of Bennington? Yes, it says so and gives the date but did catamounts take part in the battle?

— Arlie Slabaugh, United States Commemorative Coins (1975), p. 81

The obverse features an idealized portrait of Ira Allen, one different from the one Fry had used in his statue and models. Allen wears a periwig, and below his head appears his name. The words FOUNDER OF VERMONT and UNITED STATES OF AMERICA surround his portrait.

The reverse features a catamount, facing and walking to the left. The animal is virtually penned in with lettering, with BATTLE OF BENNINGTON, IN GOD WE TRUST and the anniversary dates above him, E PLURIBUS UNUM and HALF DOLLAR below, AUG. 16 (representing the battle's date) below its head, and the designer's initials, CK, between its rearmost paw and the end of its tail.

Keck's design has been widely criticized, often because of the catamount—Swiatek and Breen summed up the coin as "an almost unrecognizably idealized Ira Allen, mated with an equally unrecognizably idealized wildcat. We cannot be sure of the species: cougar? panther? puma?" Q. David Bowers described the reverse as bearing "a large catlike animal of uncertain species, which had nothing to do with the history of Vermont being commemorated but was a rebus for the Catamount [Fay's] Tavern, a subtlety lost on just about everyone who saw it". Art historian Cornelius Vermeule, in his volume about U.S. coins and medals, wrote that the Vermont coin "is spoiled by an excess of lettering on both sides ... It seems superfluous to have to state on the obverse that Ira Allen was 'Founder of Vermont'."

== Production, distribution, and collecting ==
A total of 40,034 Vermont Sesquicentennial half dollars were struck at the Philadelphia Mint during January and February 1927, with the excess over the round number reserved for inspection and testing at the 1928 meeting of the annual Assay Commission. They were distributed by local banks, which charged $1 per coin, and they sold principally to Vermonters. The distribution was coordinated by the Bennington Battle Monument and Historical Association of Bennington, Vermont. Four banks in Bennington each received 2,000 coins for distribution, as did four banks in Rutland. In 1929, the Bennington group was selling the coins by mail at a charge of $1.25 per coin by registered mail and $1 per coin for ten or more if the buyer paid for conveyance by an express company.

Sales were not as robust as hoped. In November 1928, Spargo wrote to Mint Director Grant, requesting information on how to return several thousand coins, and by 1934, a total of 11,892 pieces had been returned to the Mint for redemption and melting. Profits from the coin went to the Vermont Historical Trust, and were used to benefit museums and historical societies in the state, including the Bennington Museum. Swiatek and Breen, alluding to the scandals that embroiled other commemorative coins, noted that "it is a testimony to something or other in Vermont that there was never the faintest breath of suspicion at any time about anything connected with the distribution of the coins."

By 1935, the coins, in uncirculated condition, sold for about $2, a price increased by fifty cents during the commemorative coin boom of 1936. They had subsided to the $2 level by 1940, but thereafter increased steadily in value, peaking at $825 during the second commemorative coin boom in 1980. The 2018 edition of R. S. Yeoman's A Guide Book of United States Coins, published in 2017, lists the coin for between $250 and $750, depending on condition. An exceptional specimen sold at auction in 2014 for $7,344.

== Sources ==
- Bowers, Q. David (1992). Commemorative Coins of the United States: A Complete Encyclopedia. Wolfeboro, NH: Bowers and Merena Galleries, Inc. ISBN 978-0-943161-35-8.
- Flynn, Kevin (2008). The Authoritative Reference on Commemorative Coins 1892–1954. Roswell, GA: Kyle Vick. OCLC 711779330.
- Gregory, Barbara J. (June 2003). "The Vermont Saga". The Numismatist. Colorado Springs, CO: American Numismatic Association: 48–51.
- Morgan, Edmund (1956). The Birth of the Republic: 1763-1789. Chicago, Illinois: University of Chicago Press. OCLC 264638977.
- Slabaugh, Arlie R. (1975). United States Commemorative Coinage (second ed.). Racine, WI: Whitman Publishing. ISBN 978-0-307-09377-6.
- Swiatek, Anthony (2012). Encyclopedia of the Commemorative Coins of the United States. Chicago: KWS Publishers. ISBN 978-0-9817736-7-4.
- Swiatek, Anthony; Breen, Walter (1981). The Encyclopedia of United States Silver & Gold Commemorative Coins, 1892 to 1954. New York: Arco Publishing. ISBN 978-0-668-04765-4.
- Taxay, Don (1967). An Illustrated History of U.S. Commemorative Coinage. New York: Arco Publishing. ISBN 978-0-668-01536-3.
- United States House of Representatives Committee on Coinage, Weights and Measures (1925). Coinage of 50 Cent Pieces in Commemoration of the One Hundred and Fiftieth Anniversary of the Battle of Bennington and the Independence of Vermont. United States Government Printing Office.
- United States House of Representatives Committee on Coinage, Weights and Measures (January 30, 1925). Coinage of 50-cent Pieces for Anniversary of Battle of Bennington. United States Government Printing Office.
- Vermeule, Cornelius (1971). Numismatic Art in America. Cambridge, MA: The Belknap Press of Harvard University Press. ISBN 978-0-674-62840-3.
- Yeoman, R.S. (2015). A Guide Book of United States Coins (1st Deluxe ed.). Atlanta, GA: Whitman Publishing. ISBN 978-0-7948-4307-6.
- Yeoman, R.S. (2017). Bressett, Kenneth (ed.). A Guide Book of United States Coins 2018 (71st ed.). Atlanta, Georgia: Whitman Publishing. ISBN 978-0794845032.
