= Raphael Beck =

Raphael Beck may refer to:

- Raphael Beck (artist) (1858–1947), American artist
- Raphael Beck (badminton) (born 1992), German badminton player
