= Fort Vancouver Centennial half dollar =

U.S. bank commemorative fifty-cent piece

- United States
- Value: 50 cents (0.50 US dollars)
- Mass: 12.5 g
- Diameter: 30.61 mm (1.20 in)
- Thickness: 2.15 mm (0.08 in)
- Edge: Reeded
- Composition: 90.0% silver; 10.0% copper
- Silver: 0.36169 troy oz
- Years of minting: 1925
- Mintage: 50,028 including 28 pieces for the Assay Commission (35,034 melted)
- Mint marks: None, all pieces struck at the San Francisco Mint without mint mark

Obverse
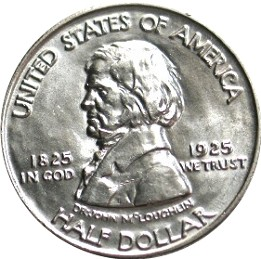
- Design: John McLoughlin
- Designer: Laura Gardin Fraser
- Design date: 1925

Reverse
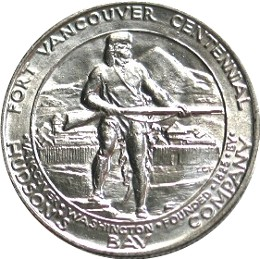
- Design: Frontiersman with Mount Hood in background
- Designer: Laura Gardin Fraser
- Design date: 1925

The Fort Vancouver Centennial half dollar, sometimes called the Fort Vancouver half dollar, is a commemorative fifty-cent piece struck by the United States Bureau of the Mint in 1925. The coin was designed by Laura Gardin Fraser. Its obverse depicts John McLoughlin, who was in charge of Fort Vancouver (present-day Vancouver, Washington) from its construction in 1825 until 1846. From there, he effectively ruled the Oregon Country on behalf of the Hudson's Bay Company. The reverse shows an armed frontiersman standing in front of the fort.

Washington Representative Albert Johnson wanted a coin for Fort Vancouver's centennial celebrations, but was persuaded to accept a medal instead. But when another congressman was successful in amending a coinage bill to add a commemorative, Johnson tacked on language authorizing a coin for Fort Vancouver. The Senate agreed to the changes, and President Calvin Coolidge signed the authorizing act on February 24, 1925.

Fraser was engaged to design the coin on the recommendation of the United States Commission of Fine Arts. The coins were flown from the San Francisco Mint, where they were struck, to Washington state by airplane as a publicity stunt. They sold badly; much of the issue was returned for redemption and melting, and the failure may have been a factor in one official's suicide. Due to the low number of surviving pieces, the coins are valuable today.

== Background ==
Fort Vancouver, on the north bank of the Columbia River in what is today Vancouver, Washington, lay across the river from what would become Portland, Oregon. It was founded in 1825 by the Hudson's Bay Company chief factor for the area, Dr. John McLoughlin. The company sought furs and other trade goods, and was in competition with John Jacob Astor's Pacific Fur Company, which had an outpost at what is now Astoria, Oregon. Fort Vancouver was named for the British sea captain George Vancouver, who also gave his name to Vancouver in Canada.

Until the Oregon Treaty of 1846 settled the disputed claims of the United States and Britain, McLoughlin was what government there was in the Oregon Country. McLoughlin's word was obeyed by white man and Native American alike, and there were no significant wars there in that time. Fort Vancouver became the trading center for a large area, and the largest settlement west of the Great Plains. With the coming of American rule in 1846, McLoughlin resigned from the Hudson's Bay Company, going to live at Oregon City, which he had founded, and became its mayor in 1851, two years after becoming a U.S. citizen. He died in 1857; a century later, the Oregon Legislature named him the "Founder of Oregon", and Fort Vancouver is now a national historic site.

== Legislation ==
The Fort Vancouver Centennial Corporation hoped to sell commemorative half dollars at the planned celebration, and persuaded Representative Albert Johnson of Washington state to introduce legislation in the House of Representatives. In May 1924, he and Senator Wesley Jones, also of Washington state, introduced legislation in their houses of Congress for a half dollar commemorating the centennial of Fort Vancouver. The bills were not given any hearings. Indiana Representative Albert Vestal, the chairman of the House Committee on Coinage, Weights, and Measures, met with Johnson and persuaded him to introduce a bill for a medal instead. Vestal reasoned that the Treasury Department was opposing more commemorative coin issues, as these were finding their way into circulation and confusing the public. On February 3, 1925, Jones introduced a bill for a medal, and on the 12th, Johnson did the same.

Legislation for a Vermont Sesquicentennial half dollar had been introduced by that state's senior senator, Frank Greene, and had passed the Senate. When that bill came to the floor of the House of Representatives on February 16, California Representative John E. Raker moved to amend it to provide for a California Diamond Jubilee half dollar. Vestal asked to be heard in opposition to the amendment, stating that his committee, after recommending the Vermont bill, had decided to promote no further coin bills. He added that because of this, Johnson had agreed to withdraw his bill. The Minority Leader, Democratic Congressman Finis J. Garrett of Tennessee, asked why the committee had not set the rule before considering the Vermont bill, and Vestal admitted it was hard to answer. The House voted, and the amendment was added. Johnson—to applause from his colleagues—moved a further amendment, to add "and Vancouver, Wash." The amendment passed, as did the bill.

Johnson realized that such a simple amendment might not result in a coin being issued. He therefore returned to the House floor soon thereafter, asking that the bill be reconsidered, so he could couch his amendment in the same phrasing as for the other two coins. Once the bill was again being considered, Johnson added his amendment, but Vestal moved that the bill be returned to his committee. Vestal's motion failed, 24 ayes to 67 noes. Lengthy procedural wrangling followed over whether that vote could be objected to because there was no quorum present. Once that was resolved, the House passed the bill again. The bill was returned to the Senate the following day. Kansas's Charles Curtis moved on behalf of Greene that the Senate agree to the House amendments, and though Treasury Secretary Andrew W. Mellon urged President Calvin Coolidge to veto it, the bill, authorizing all three coins, was enacted by the President's signature on February 24, 1925.

== Preparation ==
Once the coin had been approved by Congress, the Centennial Corporation submitted plaster models by Portland artist Sidney Bell. His initials (SB) appeared on the obverse. They were sent to the Commission of Fine Arts, charged by a 1921 executive order by President Warren G. Harding with rendering advisory opinions regarding public artworks, including coins. The models showed McLoughlin on the obverse and the fort stockade with Mount Hood in the background for the reverse. Bell had adapted the portrait of McLoughlin from a sketch made by John T. Urquhart. These designs were likely dictated by the Centennial Corporation. On May 22, the Commission rejected the models, describing them as "interesting" but stating that an experienced medalist would be needed. It recommended Chester Beach, but when the corporation tried to hire him, it turned out he was traveling. The corporation instead hired the commission's second choice, Laura Gardin Fraser, an experienced designer of commemorative coins.

Since the Centennial Corporation had decided what design elements it wanted to see on the half dollar, Fraser had to do her own interpretation of the designs Bell had essayed. Hired on June 15, she completed her models by July 1, when Louis Ayres, a member of the commission, came to view them. He was enthusiastic, and sent a letter to commission chairman Charles Moore to that effect, writing "the whole coin looks very interesting to me, and I think is mighty good." The models were approved by the commission, and then by Mellon. Dies were prepared at the Philadelphia Mint, then shipped to San Francisco, where the coins were to be struck.

== Design ==
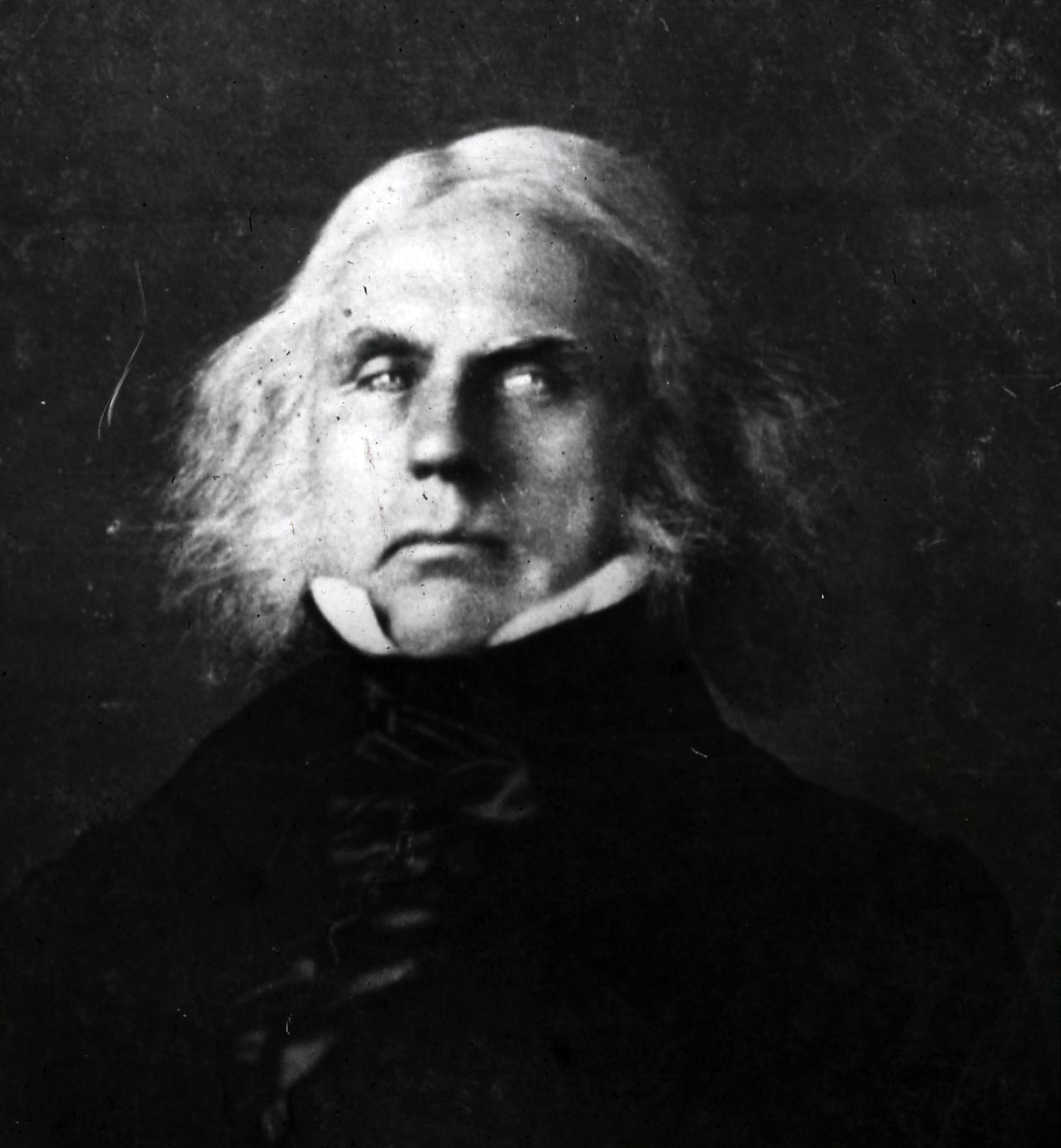
The coin's obverse depicts John McLoughlin.

The obverse features a portrait of McLoughlin, facing left. The name of his adopted country overarches him, and his name and 'HALF DOLLAR' are below him, with the centennial dates and 'IN GOD WE TRUST' flanking his bust. Fraser had no likenesses of McLoughlin to work with, and what she based her portrait of him on is unclear. It shows him as an older man than the 41 years he was at the time of Fort Vancouver's founding. The reverse shows an armed frontiersman, dressed in buckskins, with the stockade of Fort Vancouver behind him, and Mt. Hood in the distance. The inscription is somewhat broken up, but is intended to be read as 'FORT VANCOUVER CENTENNIAL VANCOUVER WASHINGTON FOUNDED 1825 BY HUDSON'S BAY COMPANY'. Numismatists have debated whether the absence of a mint mark was intentional; it is the only commemorative coin issue struck at Denver or San Francisco that lacks one. The artist's initials, 'LGF', are at lower right on the reverse, on the other side of the circle from the date '1825'.

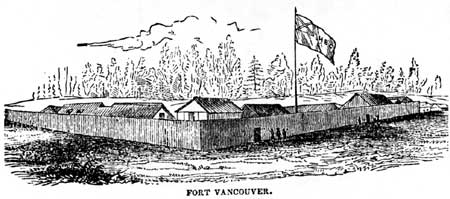
Fort Vancouver in 1841

Anthony Swiatek and Walter Breen, in their 1988 book on commemorative coins, describe Fraser's design as "better than anything [Chester] Beach could have come up with". Cornelius Vermeule, in his volume on the artistry of U.S. coins and medals, deemed Fraser's half dollar "a most acceptable coin". He wrote, "the obverse tries Pisanello's spacing of the lettering and circumscribed roughness of the bust, while the reverse has too much scenery in the background, surrounded by too much lettering. This and the Hawaiian Sesquicentennial coin of 1928 prove that background scenery or geography ought to be omitted from commemorative half dollars".

== Production, distribution, and collecting ==
Only 50,000 of the authorized mintage of 300,000 were coined, plus 28 pieces intended to be sent to Philadelphia to be available for inspection and testing at the 1926 meeting of the annual Assay Commission. The minting was done not later than August 1 at San Francisco. As a publicity stunt, the entire mintage (less the 28 assay coins) was flown by air to Vancouver, Washington, by United States Army Air Corps Lieutenant Oakley G. Kelly on August 1; the shipment, including packaging, weighed 1,462 pounds (663 kg). On arrival, the coins were received by Herbert Campbell, head of the centennial commission.

The half dollars were intended to help pay for the centennial festivities in Vancouver. These were held from August 17 to 23, with a highlight being a pageant, "The Coming of the White Man", which was "based on historical fact". The coins were sold at $1 each; several hundred were gilded, diminishing their future value as numismatic specimens; others were kept as pocket pieces, or were spent.

The poor sales caused financial problems and may have caused a suicide, for on August 22, Charles A. Watts, secretary of the Centennial Corporation and described by Campbell as the real force behind the coin, killed himself. The day before he died, he told a meeting of the corporation there were funds enough to pay all debts, and that Fraser was not owed any money. Neither proved to be the case, and unpaid bills totaled $6,000, with no money to pay them. In fact, Fraser's fee of $1,200 was outstanding, and she tried to get paid even with the half dollars, but her bill was unsatisfied until a year later, when she was paid by check. The half dollars were not owned by the corporation, as the Vancouver National Bank had advanced money for them. Sales came to a virtual halt by the end of October. Texas coin dealer B. Max Mehl offered to buy the remainder of the issue at face value, but this was rejected as many people had paid $1 for their coins. A total of 35,034 pieces were sent back to the mint for redemption and melting, leaving 14,966 pieces outstanding. According to Swiatek and Breen, "given the remoteness and exclusively local nature of the celebration, it is surprising that as many as fourteen thousand coins were sold."

A sale of 1,000 coins was made to an executive of the Hudson's Bay Company, and they were placed in the Archives of Manitoba in Winnipeg, Canada. They were stolen in 1982 by a caretaker, who spent them and redeemed some for Canadian currency at a bank. Many wound up in the hands of a coin dealer, who sold them widely. At the time, the coins were worth about US$800 each. Once the theft was realized, the Province of Manitoba filed suit to recover the remaining coins, but a settlement allowed the dealer to retain them.

The coins quickly commanded a premium after their 1925 issue due to their scarcity, rising to $10 by 1928 before falling back to $7 by 1930, in uncirculated condition. They peaked at about $9 during the commemorative coin boom of 1936. They had subsided back to the $6 level by 1940, but thereafter increased steadily in value, rising to $1,600 during the second commemorative coin boom in 1980. The edition of R. S. Yeoman's A Guide Book of United States Coins published in 2017 lists the coin for between $300 and $975, depending on condition. A near-pristine specimen sold at auction in 2014 for $8,225.

== Sources ==
- Bowers, Q. David (1992). Commemorative Coins of the United States: A Complete Encyclopedia. Wolfeboro, New Hampshire: Bowers and Merena Galleries, Inc. ISBN 978-0-943161-35-8.
- Flynn, Kevin (2008). The Authoritative Reference on Commemorative Coins 1892–1954. Roswell, Georgia: Kyle Vick. OCLC 711779330.
- Slabaugh, Arlie R. (1975). United States Commemorative Coinage (second ed.). Racine, Wisconsin: Whitman Publishing. ISBN 978-0-307-09377-6.
- Swiatek, Anthony (2012). Encyclopedia of the Commemorative Coins of the United States. Chicago: KWS Publishers. ISBN 978-0-9817736-7-4.
- Swiatek, Anthony; Breen, Walter (1981). The Encyclopedia of United States Silver & Gold Commemorative Coins, 1892 to 1954. New York: Arco Publishing. ISBN 978-0-668-04765-4.
- Taxay, Don (1967). An Illustrated History of U.S. Commemorative Coinage. New York: Arco Publishing. ISBN 978-0-668-01536-3.
- Vermeule, Cornelius (1971). Numismatic Art in America. Cambridge, Massachusetts: The Belknap Press of Harvard University Press. ISBN 978-0-674-62840-3.
- Yeoman, R.S. (2015). A Guide Book of United States Coins (1st Deluxe ed.). Atlanta, Georgia: Whitman Publishing. ISBN 978-0-7948-4307-6.
- Yeoman, R.S. (2017). Bressett, Kenneth (ed.). A Guide Book of United States Coins 2018 (71st ed.). Atlanta, Georgia: Whitman Publishing. ISBN 978-0794845032.
