= California Diamond Jubilee half dollar =

United States commemorative silver fifty-cent piece

- United States
- Value: 50 cents (0.50 US dollars)
- Mass: 12.5 g
- Diameter: 30.61 mm (1.20 in)
- Thickness: 2.15 mm (0.08 in)
- Edge: Reeded
- Composition: 90.0% silver; 10.0% copper
- Silver: 0.36169 troy oz
- Years of minting: 1925
- Mint marks: S (all coins). Located at the base of the reverse below the letter D in DOLLAR.

Obverse
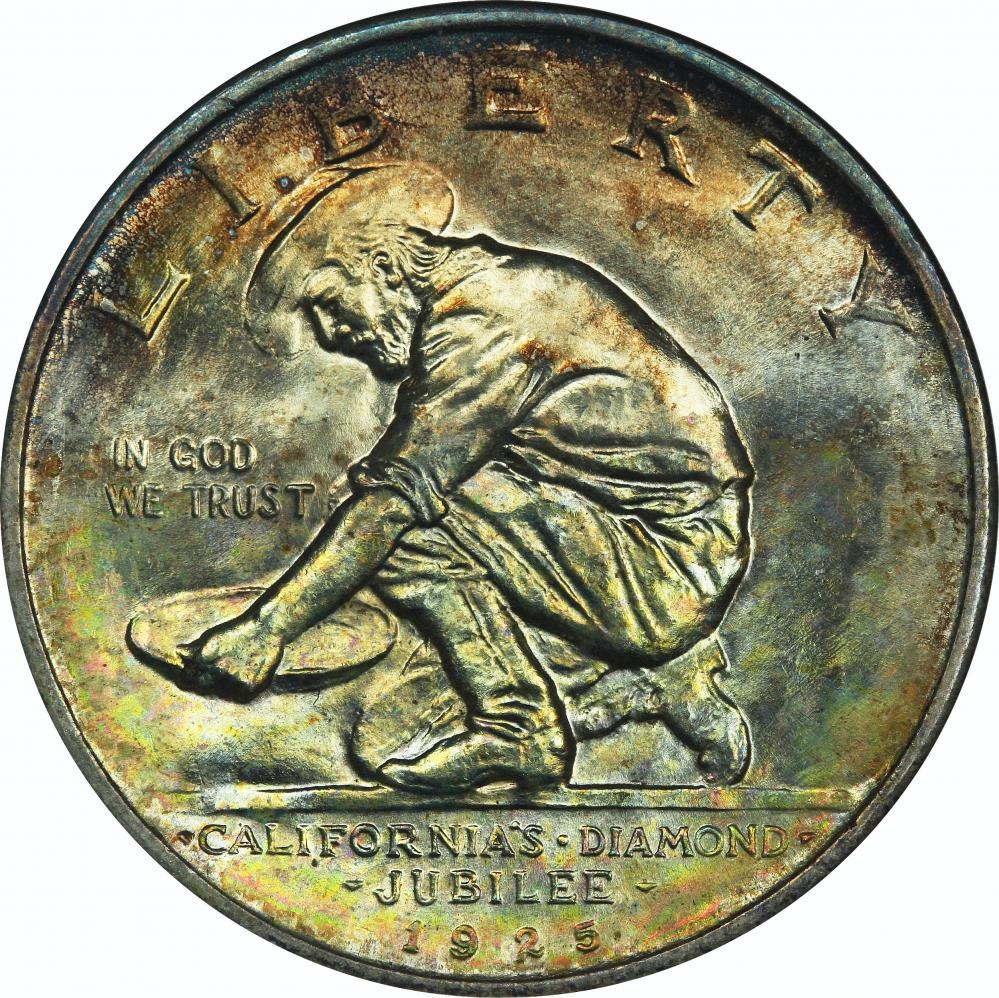
- Design: A Forty-Niner panning for gold
- Designer: Jo Mora
- Design date: 1925

Reverse
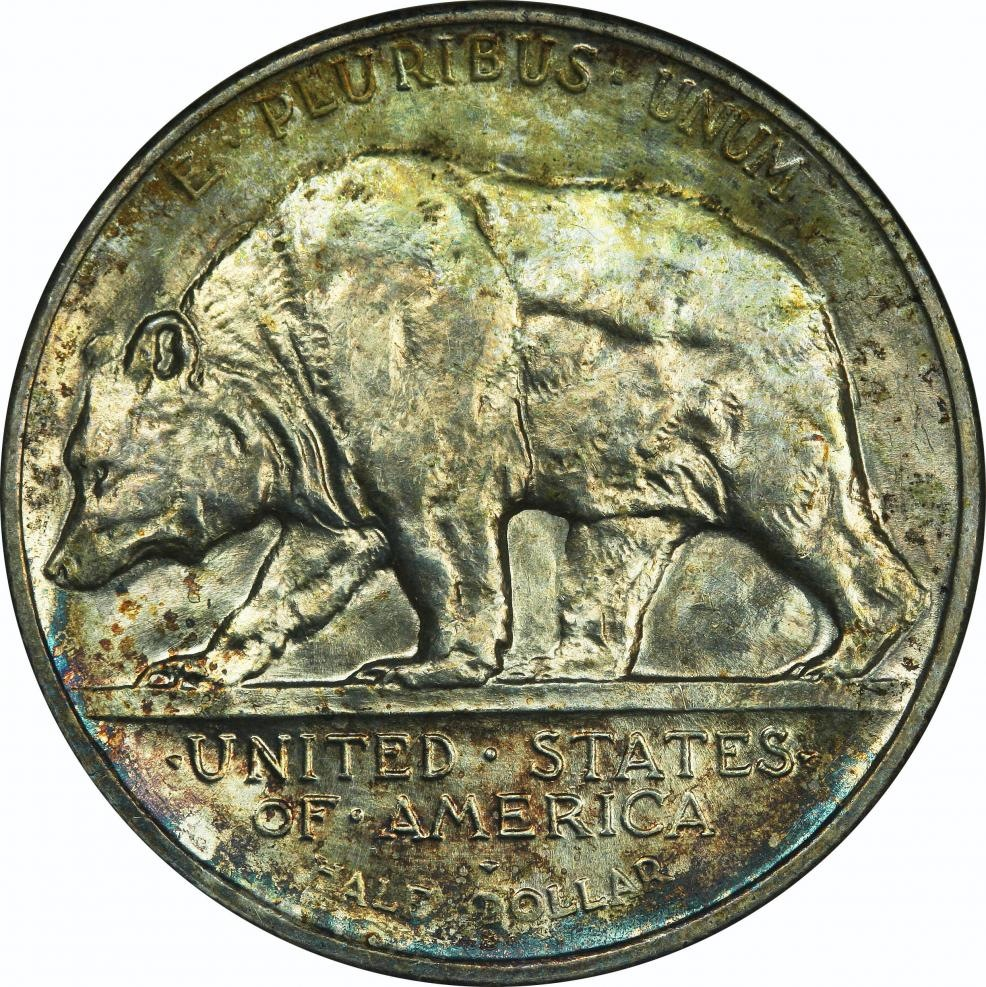
- Design: Grizzly bear
- Designer: Jo Mora
- Design date: 1925

The California Diamond Jubilee half dollar was a United States commemorative silver fifty-cent piece struck at the San Francisco Mint in 1925. It was issued to celebrate the 75th anniversary of California statehood.

The San Francisco Citizens' Committee wished to issue a commemorative coin as a fundraiser for a celebration of the statehood diamond jubilee. A California congressman attached authorization for it to another coinage bill, which was approved by Congress in early 1925. Designs by sculptor Jo Mora met a hostile reception at the Commission of Fine Arts, but the Citizens' Committee would not change them, and they were approved. The coin has been widely praised for its beauty in the years since.

The coins were struck in August 1925 in San Francisco, and were sold the following month. They did not sell as well as hoped: only some 150,000 of the authorized mintage of 300,000 were ever struck, and of that, nearly half went unsold and were melted. The coin is catalogued at between $200 and $1,300, though exceptional specimens have sold for more.

== Background ==
The land that is now the state of California was first visited by Europeans when Spanish explorer Juan Rodriguez Cabrillo visited there in 1542. His report to the Spanish crown garnered little interest, and it was not until the English seaman Sir Francis Drake touched there in 1579 that the Spanish were moved to colonize the area. Nevertheless, over the next 275 years, California saw few settlers, mostly around the chain of missions that were founded there, both under the Spanish, and subsequently under Mexican rule.

According to numismatic author Arnie Slabaugh, "the coming of American settlers brought two changes to California that continue to this day: immigrants (both foreign and American) and activity". In 1846, American settlers revolted against Mexican rule, founding the Bear Flag Republic; its flag featured a grizzly bear. The republic proved short-lived; the Mexican–American War had begun, and California was occupied by U.S. forces. A week before the Treaty of Guadalupe Hidalgo was signed in January 1848, gold was discovered at Sutter's Mill by James W. Marshall. The California Gold Rush followed, as did statehood for California in 1850.

== Inception ==
The California Diamond Jubilee half dollar originated with the desire of the San Francisco Citizens' Committee (Angelo J. Rossi, chairman), to have a commemorative half dollar to sell as a fundraiser for a local celebration in commemoration of the 75th anniversary of California statehood. On January 9, 1925, a bill was introduced in the Senate for a silver half dollar and gold dollar commemorating the Battle of Bennington and the American Revolutionary War-period independence of Vermont. The bill passed the Senate after an amendment removed the gold dollar. When the bill was debated in the House of Representatives on February 16, 1925, California Congressman John E. Raker offered an amendment to add a coin for the 75th anniversary of California statehood. This was strongly opposed by Representative Albert Vestal, chairman of the House Committee on Coinage, Weights, and Measures, who stated that the Bureau of the Mint opposed making "these special coins". He added that because of this, Washington Representative Albert Johnson had agreed to withdraw his bill for a commemorative honoring Fort Vancouver, in Washington state. Raker nevertheless persisted, and his amendment passed. Representative Johnson then offered an amendment to add a Fort Vancouver Centennial half dollar to the bill, and to Vestal's chagrin, this also was adopted. The bill passed the House of Representatives, and the Senate agreed to the House amendments without debate on February 17.

Treasury Secretary Andrew W. Mellon urged President Calvin Coolidge to veto the bill, writing:

The Federal Government is permitting its coinage system to be commercialized for the profit of any celebration, whether national in its scope or not ... I feel that even for an anniversary of national significance the Treasury should not be asked to debauch its currency system ... Each case is precedent for the next case, and we must draw some limit to the diversion of our currency from its legitimate purpose as a means of payment by the general public for its business transactions, to a means of profit to particular bodies.

Nevertheless, Coolidge signed the bill, which became the Act of February 24, 1925, authorizing all three coins. This was the first time commemorative coin legislation covered more than one issue. A total of 300,000 for the California piece was authorized, with the coins to be drawn at face value on behalf of the Citizens' Committee by the San Francisco Clearing House Association or the Los Angeles Clearing House Association. The latter group of banks had in 1923 distributed the Monroe Doctrine Centennial half dollar.

== Preparation ==
On May 4, 1925, Rossi sent a letter to Mint Director Robert J. Grant. Rossi noted that there had been some delay in the preparation of the design for the new half dollar, and that California Senator Samuel M. Shortridge had urged Rossi's committee to move forward without delay. Rossi enclosed sketches by California sculptor Joseph (Jo) Mora, with the promise that a finished design, and a model, would follow. Citizens' Committee members had selected Mora unanimously, feeling he was the one artist who could capture the spirit of what was being commemorated.

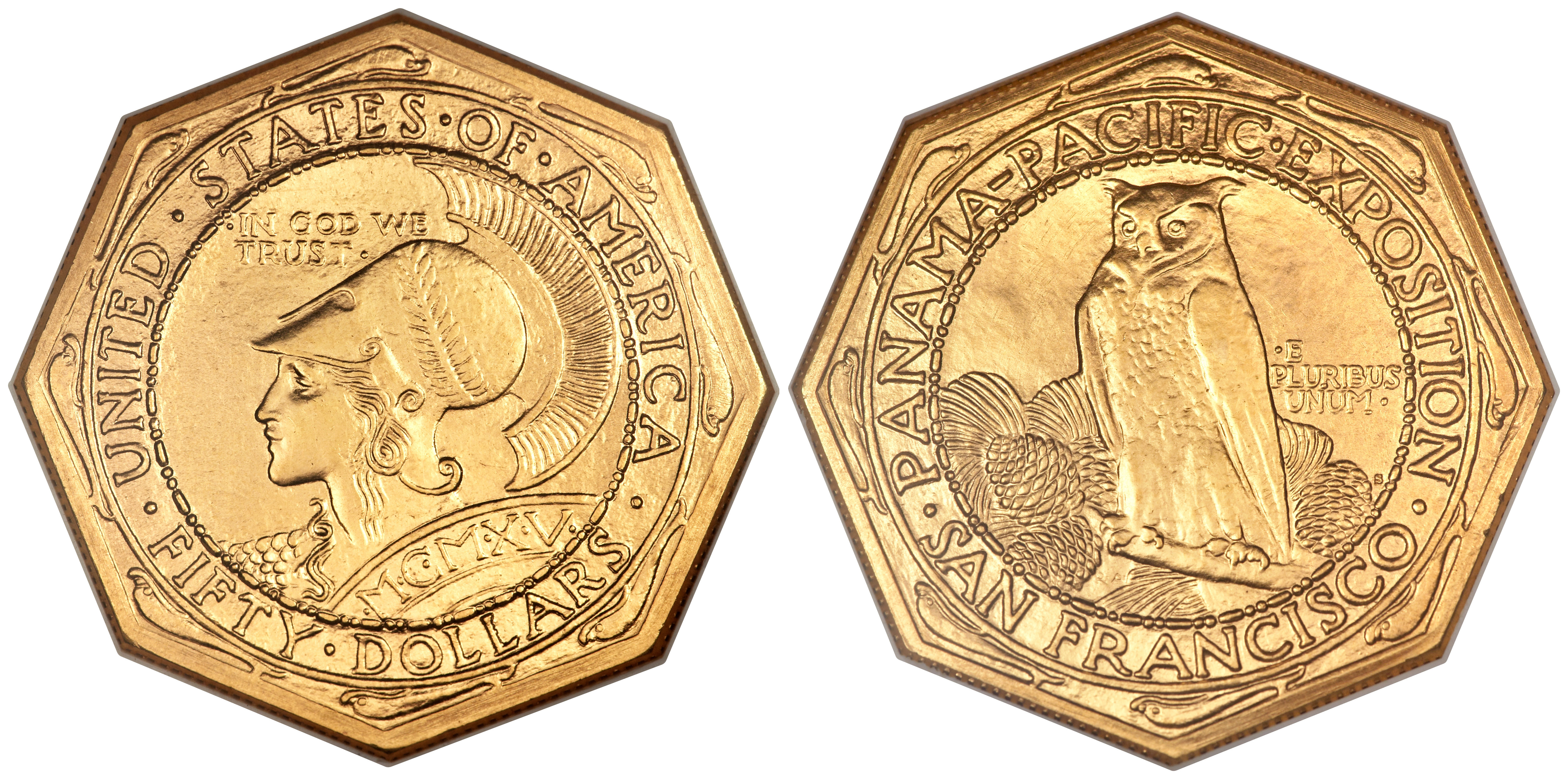
Robert I. Aitken created the $50 Panama-Pacific coins, but was not hired for the California Diamond Jubilee half dollar due to expense.

On receipt, the sketches and letter were forwarded to the Commission of Fine Arts, charged since 1921 with making recommendations on coinage design, and then to its sculptor member, James Earle Fraser, designer of the Buffalo nickel. Fraser wrote to Rossi on May 18, deprecating the designs, "the bear is entirely too short, and the whole thing inexperienced and amateurish." He recommended that Chester Beach (credited with the design of the 1923 Monroe Doctrine coin) or Robert I. Aitken (who had created the 1915 Panama-Pacific $50 pieces) be hired, as both were from California and might create "something which would be far more interesting and with a bigger sense of what California really is".

Despite Fraser's recommendations, the Citizens' Committee stayed with Mora, who quickly turned out the finished sketches. Anthony Swiatek and Walter Breen, in their volume on U.S. commemorative coins, suggested that the Citizens' Committee did not hire Beach or Aitken due to lack of time and an unwillingness to pay their large fees. The finished models were sent to the Philadelphia Mint on June 17, and were forwarded to the commission. By this time, Fraser was no longer a member of the Commission and they were sent to Lorado Taft, along with a note that the Citizens' Committee had not hired Aitken due to the expense and that the new designs were little better than the old. However, both Taft and another member, Louis Ayres, recommended acceptance. Ayres did suggest "that 'In God We Trust' be placed in some position where it does not seem as if the '49ers were frying it in oil". Numismatic historian Don Taxay averred that this advice was not followed due to the lack of an alternative position in which to place the motto.

With the designs accepted, the Mint created working dies based on the plaster model in July 1925. These were sent from Philadelphia to the San Francisco Mint, where 150,000 coins were struck in August, plus 200 reserved for inspection and testing at the 1926 meeting of the United States Assay Commission.

== Design ==
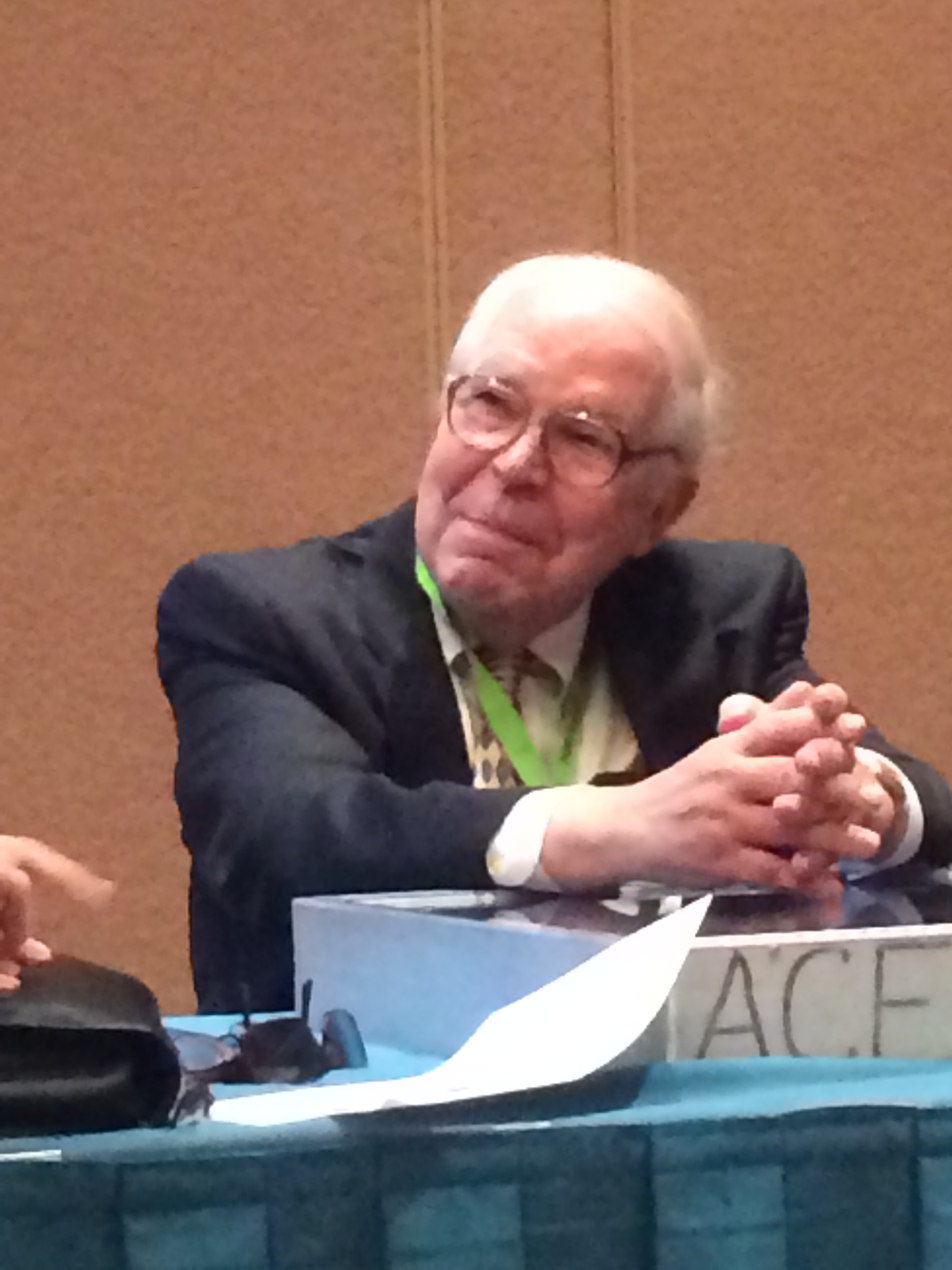
Q. David Bowers has praised the California Diamond Jubilee half dollar.

In creating the half dollar, Mora used motifs evoking California at the time of statehood in 1850. The obverse depicts a Gold Rush-era prospector, kneeling. He washes material with his pan, seeking bits of placer gold. The reverse adapts the Flag of California, known as the Bear Flag, showing a grizzly bear. Mora left the fields, or background, of the coin unpolished, giving the piece a textured look.

The California Diamond Jubilee half dollar has been widely admired. Swiatek deemed the coin "one of my favorite numismatic works of art". According to coin dealer and author Q. David Bowers, "the Citizens' Committee ... wisely ignored Fraser's criticism". Eric Brothers, in his 2014 article on the coin, wrote that it "embodied the quintessential imagery of California in the 1850s". David M. Bullowa, who studied commemorative coins on behalf of the American Numismatic Association in the 1930s, regarded it as "a very virile and well executed half dollar, in which obverse and reverse are definitely related to each other". His contemporary, B. Max Mehl, wrote in 1937 that it was a "beautiful coin ... [the] obverse is a very fine piece of art". Nevertheless, he mistook the animal on the reverse for a polar bear, and expressed puzzlement: "I have traveled and toured California from one end to the other and have never yet seen a bear".

Art historian Cornelius Vermeule, in his volume on American coinage, deemed the California piece "one of America's greatest works of numismatic coinage." He considered the design bold and effective, and especially admired the animal, stating that the "muscles, bones, and tufts of fur express the massive determination of the bear." He felt the lettering particularly successful, as two different sizes are used, and although all three phrases customary on American coinage are present ("Liberty", "In God We Trust", and "E Pluribus Unum"), the "placing is so skillfully handled that it seems hard to realize all three ... inscriptions are used".

== Distribution and collecting ==
The first California Diamond Jubilee half dollar struck was given to the Memorial Museum in Golden Gate Park, San Francisco. The die used for the initial strikings was specially treated to produce a frosted or cameo effect, which wore down after the first approximately 75 strikings, according to Swiatek in his later volume on commemoratives. Numismatist Kevin Flynn suggests that the first 100 pieces exhibit these special surfaces, and that this was done at Rossi's request for presentation to VIPs. One piece is known without a mint mark; this was most likely a trial piece, prepared and owned by Mint Chief Engraver John R. Sinnock and later sold from his estate.

At least one half dollar must have left the San Francisco Mint by August 26, 1925, as it was shown at a meeting of the Pacific Coast Numismatic Society on that day. Children born on the 75th anniversary of California statehood (September 9, 1925) in that state were given one of the half dollars, a total of 494. A few pieces were mounted in badges used by officials. Many were sold at a celebration in San Francisco from September 6 to 12 in commemoration of that jubilee. Although thousands were purchased by coin collectors and dealers, the bulk are believed to have gone to non-collectors. According to Bowers, "distribution efforts were not particularly well coordinated" and 63,606 pieces were returned to the Mint for melting, leaving a total of 86,594 pieces distributed to the public, including the assay coins.

The half dollar has gradually risen in price over the years, with the only setbacks being the price declines following the commemorative coin booms of 1936 and 1980. The 2015 edition of Richard S. Yeoman's A Guide Book of United States Coins lists it at between $200 and $1,300, depending on condition. One, in exceptional MS-68 condition, brought $17,250 at auction in 2009.

== See also ==
- Early United States commemorative coins
