= Monroe Doctrine Centennial half dollar =

US commemorative fifty-cent piece (1923)

- United States
- Value: 50 cents (0.50 USD)
- Mass: 12.5 g
- Diameter: 30.61 mm (1.20 in)
- Thickness: 2.15 mm (0.08 in)
- Edge: Reeded
- Composition: 90.0% silver; 10.0% copper
- Silver: 0.36169 troy oz
- Years of minting: 1923
- Mint marks: S (all coins). Located under date on obverse.

Obverse
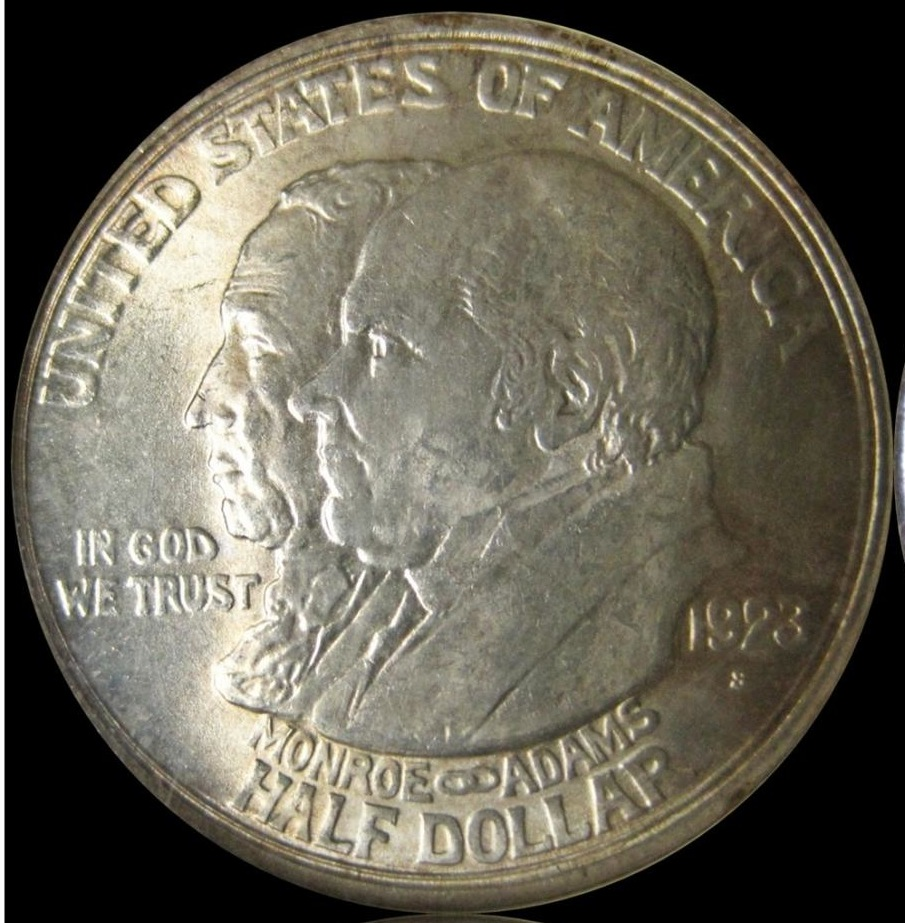
- Design: Conjoined heads of former presidents James Monroe and John Quincy Adams
- Designer: Chester Beach
- Design date: 1923

Reverse
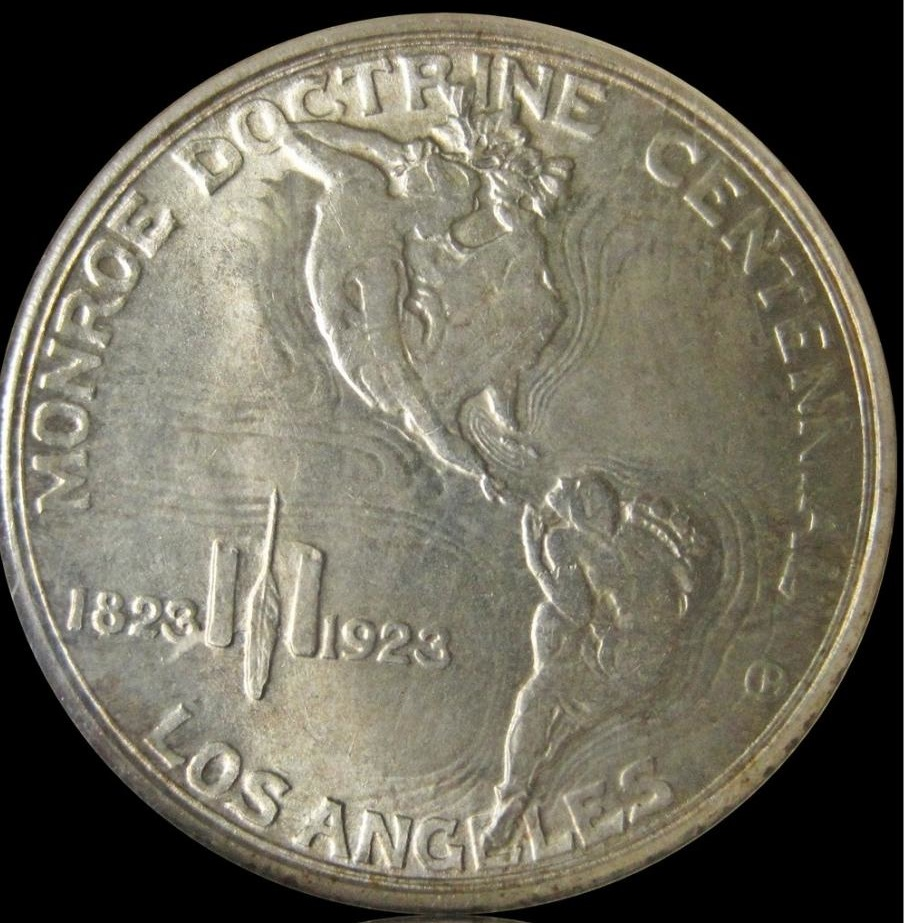
- Design: Stylized figures representing North and South America touch at the Panama Canal.
- Designer: Chester Beach; resembling a design by Raphael Beck
- Design date: 1923

The Monroe Doctrine Centennial half dollar was a fifty-cent piece struck by the United States Bureau of the Mint. Bearing portraits of former U.S. Presidents James Monroe and John Quincy Adams, the coin was issued in commemoration of the centennial of the Monroe Doctrine and was produced at the San Francisco Mint in 1923. Sculptor Chester Beach is credited with the design, although the reverse closely resembles an earlier work by Raphael Beck.

In 1922, the motion picture industry was faced with a number of scandals, including manslaughter charges against star Roscoe "Fatty" Arbuckle. Although Arbuckle was eventually acquitted, motion picture executives sought ways of getting good publicity for Hollywood. One means was an exposition, to be held in Los Angeles in mid-1923. To induce Congress to issue a commemorative coin as a fundraiser for the fair, organizers associated the exposition with the 100th anniversary of the Monroe Doctrine, and legislation for a commemorative half dollar for the centennial was passed.

The exposition was a financial failure. The coins did not sell well, and the bulk of the mintage of over 270,000 was released into circulation. Beach faced accusations of plagiarism because of the similarity of the reverse design to a work by Beck, though he and fellow sculptor James Earle Fraser denied any impropriety. Many of the pieces that had been sold at a premium and saved were spent during the Depression; most surviving coins show evidence of wear.

== Background ==
In the early 1820s, the United States deemed two matters untoward interference by European powers in its zone of influence. The first was the Russian Ukase of 1821, asserting exclusive territorial and trading rights along much of what is today Canada's Pacific coast. The United States considered this area to be part of the Oregon Country and hoped to eventually gain control of it. The second was possible European threats against the Latin American nations, newly independent from Spain. United States officials feared that a Quadruple Alliance of Prussia, Austria, Russia, and France would restore Spain to power in the Americas.

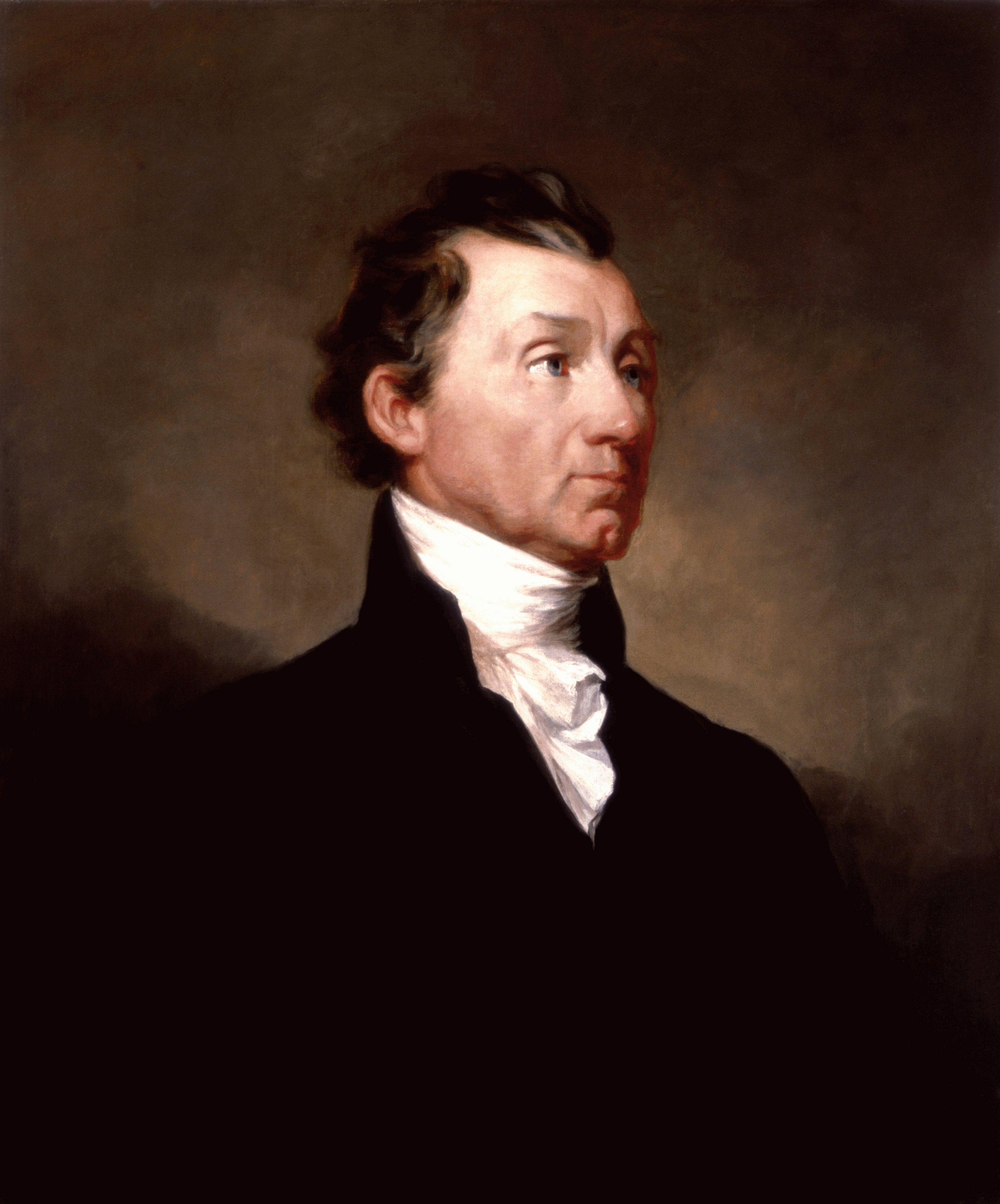
President James Monroe

British foreign minister George Canning was concerned that in the event of a Spanish restoration in Latin America, his nation would lose the ability to trade there, which it had gained since the Spanish had been ousted. In 1823, he proposed to the American minister to Great Britain, Richard Rush, that their two nations issue a joint statement against the retaking of the former Spanish colonies by force. Rush asked for instructions from President James Monroe. The President consulted with his predecessors, Thomas Jefferson and James Madison, who favored the joint statement, as an alliance with Britain would protect the United States. Nevertheless, Monroe's Secretary of State, future president John Quincy Adams, felt that if the United States was going to set forth its principles, it should speak for itself and not seem to be following the lead of Britain. Accordingly, Rush was instructed to decline the opportunity to enter into a joint statement, although he was to inform the British that the two nations agreed on most issues.

The policy which would, some 30 years later, come to be called the "Monroe Doctrine" was contained in the President's annual message to Congress on December 2, 1823. It warned European nations against new colonial ventures in the Americas, and against interference with Western Hemisphere governments. The doctrine had little practical effect at the time, as the United States lacked the ability to enforce it militarily and most European powers ignored it, considering it beneath their dignity even to respond to such a proclamation. When several European powers dispatched men to settle land in the Guianas in the 1830s, the United States did not issue a formal protest. The Mexican–American War of 1846–1848 (and the resulting Mexican Cession) increased Latin American suspicions over the doctrine, as many south of the border felt that the American purpose in warning European powers to keep out was to acquire the land for itself. Nevertheless, the Monroe Doctrine became an important part of United States foreign policy in the second half of the 19th and into the 20th century.

== Inception ==
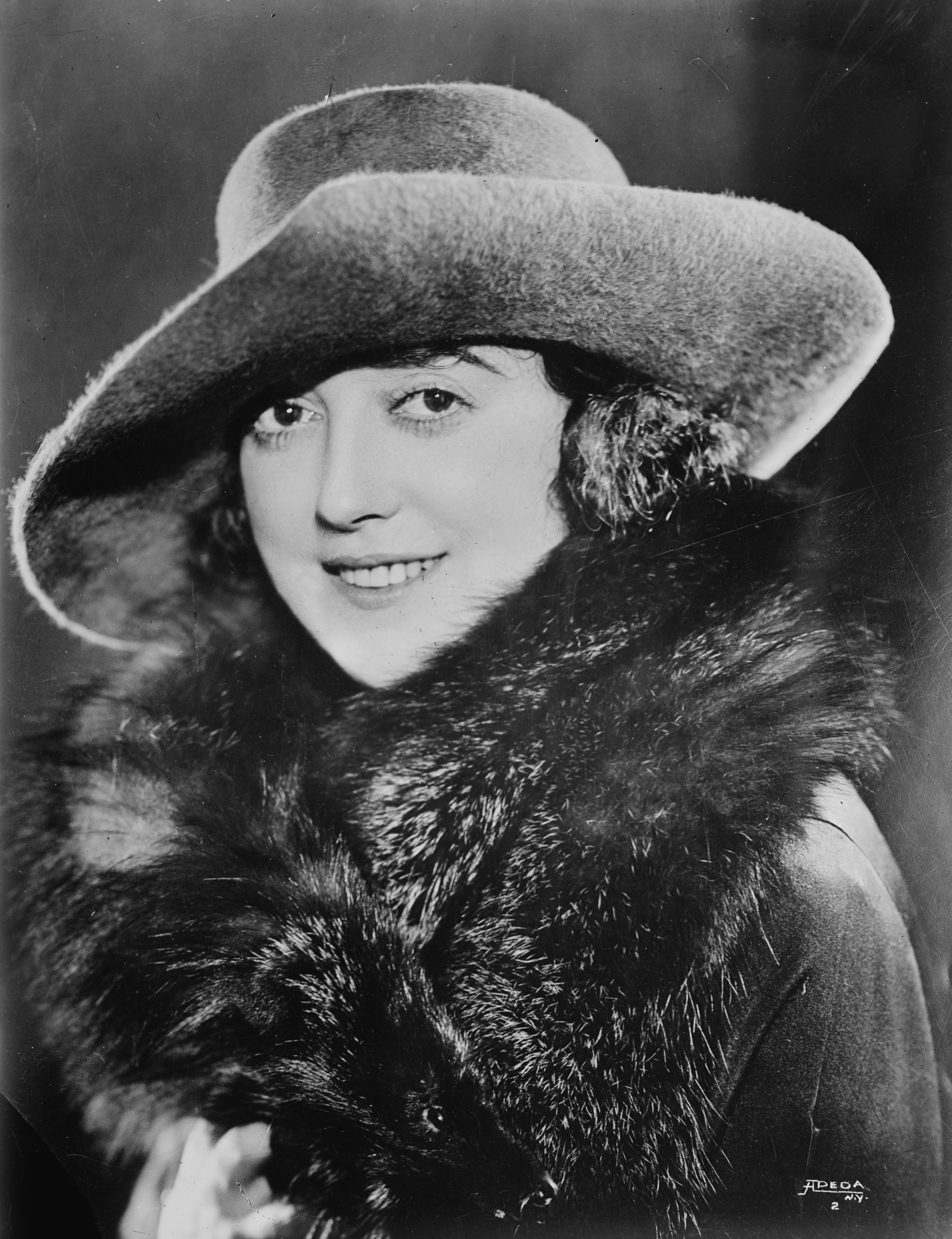
A scandal involving actress Mabel Normand was one event which led to the issuance of the Monroe Doctrine Centennial half dollar.

By 1922, the Hollywood film industry was in serious trouble. Established in the Los Angeles area during the 1910s after moving from such eastern venues as Fort Lee, New Jersey, the industry had been rocked by a number of scandals. These included the mysterious shooting death of film director William Desmond Taylor, and the subsequent evasive testimony concerning it by actress Mabel Normand, which helped destroy her career. Another notorious scandal of the early 1920s was the death of actress Virginia Rappe following an orgy at a San Francisco hotel. Actor Roscoe "Fatty" Arbuckle was, after three trials, acquitted of manslaughter, but the negative publicity ended his career as well. These scandals, together with the death of romantic lead Wallace Reid from a drug overdose and a number of instances of onscreen sexual explicitness, led to nationwide calls for a boycott of Hollywood films.

Film moguls sought means of damage control. They hired former Postmaster General Will H. Hays as censor to the industry; the Hays Code would govern how explicit a motion picture could be for decades to come. Another idea was an exposition and film festival to give good publicity to the industry, with the profits to be used for the making of educational films. Planning for this fair, to be held in Los Angeles in mid-1923, began in 1922. As other fairs, such as the World's Columbian Exposition and the Panama–Pacific Exposition, had procured the issuance of commemorative coins as a fundraiser, organizers sought a piece for the film fair. The city of Los Angeles wanted to use the fair to show it had come of age, as had Chicago for the Columbian Exposition and San Francisco with the Panama-Pacific event.

Realizing that Congress might not pass legislation for a coin to commemorate a film industry celebration, the organizers sought a historical event with a major anniversary to occur in 1923, which could be honored both at the fair and on the coin. The obvious candidate was the Boston Tea Party of 1773, but according to numismatists Anthony Swiatek and Walter Breen in their volume on U.S. commemorative coins, that episode "could not be tortured into even the vaguest relevance to California, let alone to Los Angeles". On December 18, 1922, California Congressman Walter Franklin Lineberger introduced a bill to strike a half dollar in commemoration of the centennial of the Monroe Doctrine, with the Los Angeles Clearing House (an association of banks) (Note: Swiatek and Breen suggest that the Clearing House was designated as the sponsoring organization to make the issue appear less connected with the controversial movie industry. See Swiatek & Breen, pp. 166–167) given the exclusive right to purchase the pieces from the government at face value. Lineberger claimed that Monroe's declaration had kept California, then owned by Mexico, out of the hands of European powers. The bill was questioned in the House of Representatives by Michigan Congressman Louis Cramton, and in the Senate by Vermont's Frank Greene, who stated, "it seems to me that the question is not one of selling a coin at a particular value or a particular place. The question is whether the United States government is going to go on from year to year submitting its coinage to this—well—harlotry." Despite these objections, the bill was enacted on January 24, 1923; a mintage of 300,000 pieces was authorized.

== Preparation ==
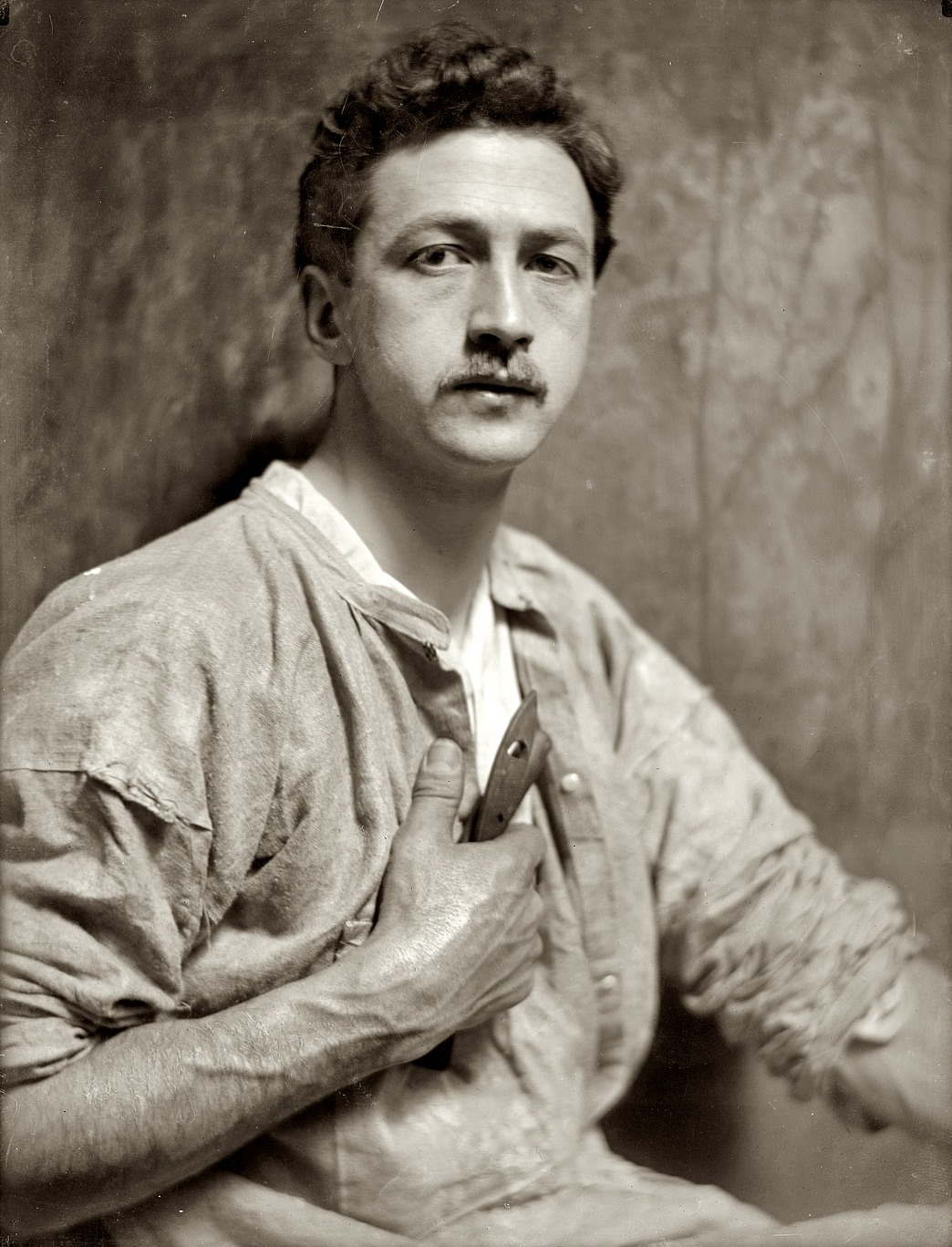
Chester Beach in 1910

The fair organizers did not await congressional approval to begin planning the coin. According to Swiatek and Breen, the fair's director general Frank B. Davison came up with the concept for the designs. On December 7, 1922, Commission of Fine Arts chairman Charles Moore wrote to Buffalo nickel designer and sculptor member of the commission James Earle Fraser, "The Los Angeles people are planning to celebrate the Monroe Doctrine Centennial. They are going to have a 50-cent piece and have decided that on the obverse shall be the heads of President Monroe and John Quincy Adams ... On the reverse will be the western continents from Hudson Bay to Cape Horn with some dots for the West Indies and some indication of the Panama Canal ... It strikes me that the designs having been settled upon, the [plaster] models could be worked out quite readily and that a pretty swell thing could be made."

Fraser contacted fellow New York sculptor Chester Beach, who agreed to do the work. On December 27, Moore wrote to Davison, informing him of Beach's hiring, and that Fraser and Beach had decided to change the reverse. Moore quoted Beach's description of the revised design:

Map of North and South America. North America is in the form of a draped figure, with the laurel of Peace [an olive branch], reaching to South America, also a draped figure carrying a Horn of Plenty. Their hands to touch at the Panama Canal. The West Indies are indicated. The current of the oceans are lightly shown. Between the dates 1823–1923 are a scroll and a quill pen, symbolizing the "Treaty". (Note: Likely the message to Congress in which Monroe set forth his policy)

Moore informed Davison that the commission had concurred with the revision, and that Beach had been instructed to complete work as quickly as possible so as to have the coins available at an early date. On February 24, 1923, commission secretary Hans Caemmerer showed the completed models to Assistant Director of the Mint Mary Margaret O'Reilly, who was pleased with them. O'Reilly suggested that if Beach was certain there would be no further changes, that he send photographs of the models to the commission's offices, to be forwarded with its endorsement to the Bureau of the Mint in Washington. This was done, and the designs were approved by both Mint Director Frank Edgar Scobey and Secretary of the Treasury Andrew Mellon on March 8. Moore was enthusiastic about the designs, writing to Davison on March 21 that "I feel great exultation over the way the model ... has turned out ... I do not know of a memorial [commemorative] coin which for sheer beauty equals this ..."

== Design ==
William E. Pike, in his 2003 article in The Numismatist about the coin, deems the design "uninspired" and complains that the low relief of the coin leaves it without sufficient detail. Coin dealer and numismatic historian Q. David Bowers states that because of the shallow relief, "newly minted coins had an insipid appearance. Few if any observers called them attractive." Art historian Cornelius Vermeule also complained about the relief, stating that it made the allegorical figures on the reverse "seem like mounted cut-outs ... the way the females are contoured to achieve their appearance of continents is a clever tour de force of calligraphic relief but an aesthetic monstrosity, a bad pun in art." He had no more praise for the obverse, "Adams, with his staring eye, is scarcely a portrait, and Monroe would not be recognized even by an expert."

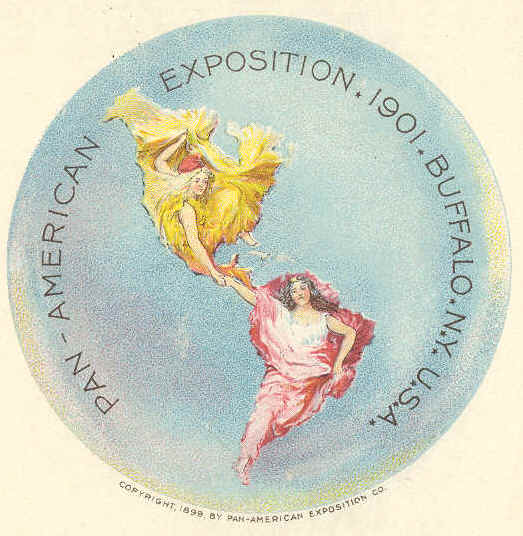
Seal of the 1901 Pan-American Exposition. Its designer, Raphael Beck, considered Beach to have plagiarized his work.

The faint lines in the field around the continents represent various ocean currents, with the Gulf Stream to the upper right of the reverse. Swiatek and Breen speculate that the reason ocean currents were shown was to symbolize the trade routes between the continents. They also consider the design to have an Art Deco look, though noting that the lettering has more of an older, Art Nouveau appearance. Beach's monogram, CB made into a circle, is found at lower right of the reverse.

On July 23, 1923, Raphael Beck, who had designed the seal for the 1901 Pan-American Exposition, wrote to Mint Director Scobey to complain that the reverse design resembled his seal, which he had copyrighted in 1899, and that Beach should be given no further credit for it. The letter was forwarded to the Commission of Fine Arts for comment. In October, Fraser wrote to Beck, stating that he had suggested to Beach that he use figures to represent the continents instead of maps, and that he had never seen the Pan-American seal until Scobey forwarded the letter. According to Bowers, "A comparison of the 1901 and 1923 designs, however, shows that this was highly unlikely."

== Distribution and collecting ==
In May and June 1923, 274,077 of the new half dollars were struck at the San Francisco Mint. Most of these were sent to the Los Angeles Clearing House, though 77 pieces were set aside for transmission to Philadelphia and examination by the 1924 United States Assay Commission.

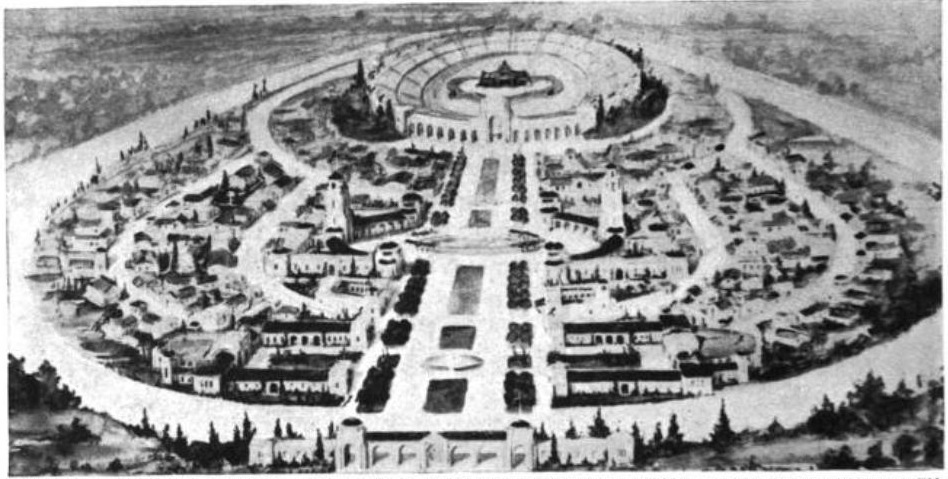
Model of the exposition; the Los Angeles Coliseum shown at center

The American Historical Revue and Motion Picture Industry Exposition was open from July 2 to August 4, 1923. The fair was located off of Figueroa Street in Exposition Park, just to the east of the brand-new Los Angeles Coliseum, where every evening a complimentary show for exposition visitors, "Montezuma and the Fall of the Aztecs", was given. Admission to the fair was fifty cents, though fairgoers could purchase a coin for a dollar at the box office and enter without further charge. After the first week, organizers realized the public was not interested in the historical theme, but was there to see favorite movie stars. Exhibitors accordingly greatly expanded the space devoted to movie attractions, but the exposition was a financial failure. Those in charge of the fair had hoped to attract a million visitors; the actual attendance was about 300,000, many of whom were teenagers given complimentary admission in the final two weeks of the fair. With the fair flirting with insolvency throughout its run, officials hoped the planned visit of President Warren Harding on August 6 would increase gate receipts, but Harding fell ill in San Francisco and died on August 2. According to Pike in his article, "its effect on the industry [was] hard to measure. However, if Hollywood owes its current status in any way to the event, then it was quite a success indeed."

Approximately 27,000 half dollars were sold at the price of $1, by mail, at banks, and at the fair. Sales continued after it closed, but by October 1923, they had dropped off to almost nothing, and the banks holding them released the remaining nine-tenths of the mintage into circulation, which accounts for the wear on most surviving specimens. Of those set aside, thousands more were spent during the Depression. The 2015 edition of A Guide Book of United States Coins lists it at $75 in uncirculated MS-60. Swiatek, in his 2012 volume on commemoratives, notes that many specimens have been treated to make them appear brighter or less worn; these, like other circulated pieces, are worth less. An exceptional specimen, certified in MS-67 condition, sold at auction for $29,900 in 2009.

== See also ==
- Early United States commemorative coins

== References and bibliography ==
Books

- Bowers, Q. David (2008). A Guide Book of United States Commemorative Coins. Atlanta, Ga.: Whitman Publishing. ISBN 978-0-7948-2256-9.
- Slabaugh, Arlie R. (1975). United States Commemorative Coinage (second ed.). Racine, Wis.: Whitman Publishing. ISBN 978-0-307-09377-6.
- Swiatek, Anthony (2012). Encyclopedia of the Commemorative Coins of the United States. Chicago: KWS Publishers. ISBN 978-0-9817736-7-4.
- Swiatek, Anthony; Breen, Walter (1981). The Encyclopedia of United States Silver & Gold Commemorative Coins, 1892 to 1954. New York: Arco Publishing. ISBN 978-0-668-04765-4.
- Taxay, Don (1967). An Illustrated History of U.S. Commemorative Coinage. New York: Arco Publishing. ISBN 978-0-668-01536-3.
- Vermeule, Cornelius (1971). Numismatic Art in America. Cambridge, Mass.: The Belknap Press of Harvard University Press. ISBN 978-0-674-62840-3.
- Yeoman, R.S. (2014). Bressett, Kenneth (ed.). A Guide Book of United States Coins 2015 (68th ed.). Atlanta, Georgia: Whitman Publishing. ISBN 978-079484215-4. OCLC 875521690. OL 28306197M.

Other sources

- Bowers, Q. David. "Chapter 8: Silver commemoratives (and clad too), Part 35". Commemorative Coins of the United States: A Complete Encyclopedia.
- Bowers, Q. David. "Chapter 8: Silver commemoratives (and clad too), Part 36". Commemorative Coins of the United States: A Complete Encyclopedia.
- Bowers, Q. David. "Chapter 8: Silver commemoratives (and clad too), Part 37". Commemorative Coins of the United States: A Complete Encyclopedia.
- Cregan, Bill (2008). "The Monroe Doctrine commemorative half dollar". The Commemorative Trail: The Journal for the Society for U.S. Commemorative Coins (3): 24–27.
- Garofalo, Michael (February 2015). "Hooray for Hollywood!". The Numismatist: 34–40.
- Pike, William E. (March 2003). "A silver half for the silver screen". The Numismatist: 47–48.
