= Raphael Beck (artist) =

American painter

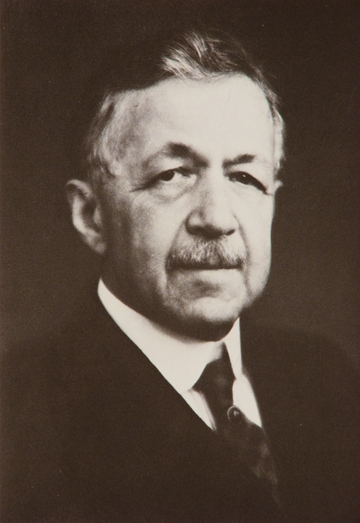
- Born: Abram Raphael Beck; November 1, 1858; Lancaster, Pennsylvania, US
- Died: May 29, 1947 (aged 88); Lockport, New York, US
- Resting place: Lockport Glenwood Cemetery
- Education: Académie Julian
- Known for: Artist
- Notable work: Work related to the Pan-American Exposition

Abram Raphael Beck (November 1, 1858 – May 29, 1947) was an American artist. He is best known for his work related to the Pan-American Exposition.

== Life and work ==
Raphael Beck was born in Lancaster, Pennsylvania on November 1, 1858. Named after the famous painter, Beck was the oldest of the eight children of J. Augustus Beck, an accomplished artist who designed the bas relief at the foot of the Washington Monument. When Beck was 20, after studying with his father, he traveled to Europe for two years to study in Munich with the famous landscape artist, Paul Weber, and then at the Académie Julian in Paris.

After his return to the States, Beck began his first major commissioned work, a series of murals for the capitol building in Harrisburg, Pennsylvania. Around this time he also settled in Lockport, New York and established a studio in Buffalo.

Beck produced a wide variety of artworks including stained glass windows, life size masks, etchings, oils, watercolors, and large murals, including a mural of the opening of the Erie Canal, an oil painting of the Pilgrims landing at Plymouth, Massachusetts, and a portrait of General Lafayette among others.

Beck maintained his studio in Buffalo for thirty years. He went on to design the logo for the 1905 Lewis and Clark Centennial Exposition in Portland, Oregon. Beck died at his home in Lockport on May 29, 1947, and is buried at the Lockport Glenwood Cemetery.

== Exposition logo ==
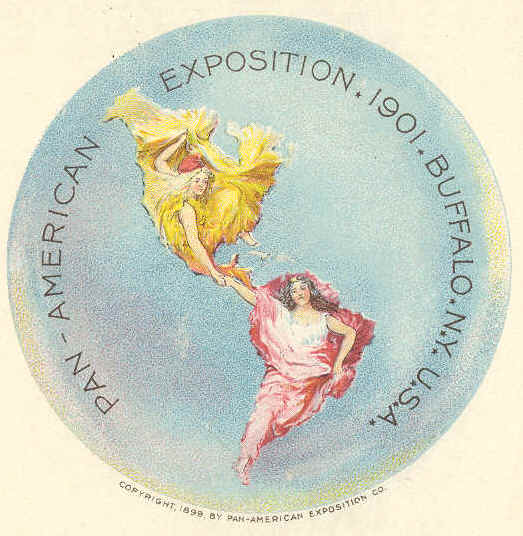
Official logo for the Pan-American Exposition

The logo of two women in the shape of North and South America, holding hands through Central America came to be the most recognizable symbol of the Pan-American Exposition. Beck's design was chosen as the official logo by the Pan-American Exposition Company from over 400 entries. It was copyrighted in 1899 and Beck was awarded $100 for his work.

His design appeared on a variety of souvenirs ranging from paperweights, pins, and postcards to decks of cards, toothpick holders, and clocks, although the Exposition's executive committee had originally planned to use the Beck design "only for dignified purposes". Realizing its popularity, however, the committee decided to profit from the design as much as possible by selling it to manufacturers. As a result, the use of the logo was so prevalent that it was on "everything that didn't move and some things that did." Some unofficial variations of the logo also appeared on souvenirs, produced by vendors who wanted to cash in on the familiarity of the Beck logo.

== McKinley's last portrait ==
Beck painted what would become President William McKinley's last portrait. During McKinley's visit to Buffalo, Beck arranged to observe McKinley during his tour of the Exposition, including the President's speech to a crowd of 50,000 near the Triumphal Bridge.

With the preliminary sketches for the portrait completed, Beck left Buffalo for a business trip to New York City. Beck was in New York when McKinley died and he went to work immediately to complete the portrait entitled President McKinley Delivering His Last Great Speech at the Pan-American Exposition, Sept. 5, 1901. The portrait was hung in the U.S. Senate and later became property of the Buffalo History Museum.

== See also ==
- William McKinley assassination
- North Park Theatre
