= Louis Ayres =

American architect (1874–1947)

William Louis Ayres
- Ayres c. 1927
- Born: 1874; Bergen Point, New Jersey, U.S.
- Died: November 30, 1947 (age 73); Manhattan, New York City, New York, U.S.
- Occupation: Architect
- Awards: Medal of Honor, New York Chapter, American Institute of Architects; Fellow, National Academy of Design
- Buildings: United States Memorial Chapel at the Meuse-Argonne American Cemetery and Memorial, Herbert C. Hoover United States Department of Commerce building

William Louis Ayres (1874–November 30, 1947), better known by his professional name Louis Ayres, was an American architect who was one of the most prominent designers of monuments, memorials, and buildings in the nation in the early part of the 20th century. His style is characterized as Medievalist, often emphasizing elements of Romanesque Revival and Italian Renaissance, and Byzantine Revival architecture. He is best known for designing the United States Memorial Chapel at the Meuse-Argonne American Cemetery and Memorial and the Herbert C. Hoover U.S. Department of Commerce Building.

== Life and career ==
He was born in 1874 in Bergen Point, New Jersey, to Mr. and Mrs. Chester D. Ayres. He graduated from Trinity School, a preparatory school located in New York City. He attended Rutgers University, graduating in 1896 with a degree in electrical engineering. After graduation, he spent three years with the firm of McKim, Mead, and White, but left (along with several other architects in the firm) to join the firm of York and Sawyer. He became a partner in the firm in 1910.

By 1921, he was one of the most prominent architects in the nation. From 1921 to 1925, he served on the prestigious U.S. Commission of Fine Arts, the federal advisory panel which had statutory approval over all major building projects in Washington, D.C. His four-year term expired in 1925, and he did not seek reappointment. The same year, he was one of the three judges on a panel which awarded the commission for the Liberty Memorial in Kansas City, Missouri, to Harold Van Buren Magonigle.

In 1935, Ayres was elected into the National Academy of Design as an Associate member, and became a full member in 1936.

=== Meuse-Argonne Chapel ===
One of Ayres' most prominent commissions came in 1925, when he was asked to design a chapel for an American military cemetery in Europe. Congress created the American Battle Monuments Commission (ABMC) in 1923 in part to consolidate the United States Department of War's divisions for military cemeteries and for stone and bronze battlefield map memorials, and in part to build, operate, and maintain American military cemeteries overseas. The ABMC was deeply influenced by Charles Moore, the chair of the Commission of Fine Arts and whose agency had final approval over the design of the cemeteries and memorials. The ABMC's plans changed and changed again over the next several years, and by 1925 it was ready to hire ""the most prominent architects in the country" for its plans. Ayres was commissioned to design the chapel at Meuse-Argonne, the largest and most important of the three sites. Ayres submitted two simple, classical designs and one French Romanesque design. Although both a classical and Romanesque design were approved for construction, the final chapel is Romanesque in style, shorter than proposed, and the colonnades on either side of it reduced in length. The chapel was dedicated on Memorial Day in 1937, the 20th anniversary of the American entry into World War I.

Ayres' continued to serve the architectural profession in many important ways in the 1920s. He was one of three judges on a panel which in 1925 awarded the design for the proposed Theodore Roosevelt memorial to be built in West Potomac Park in Washington, D.C. In 1926, Rutgers University presented him with an honorary Doctor of Humane Letters. He also was a member of the Prix de Rome scholarship and Rome Prize fellowship committees from 1926 to 1938.

=== Federal Triangle ===
In 1927, Ayres won a major commission to design the U.S. Department of Commerce building, an award which became one of his most important architectural designs. He also played a major role on a board which helped plan the Federal Triangle government office building complex.

The U.S. federal government had struggled with the need to build a number of large governmental office buildings since the mid-1910s, but little had been done. In January 1924, the Public Buildings Commission recommended that a new series of federal office buildings be built near the White House. In 1926, the U.S. Congress enacted the Public Buildings Act, which, among other things, authorized the United States Department of the Treasury to begin construction on the Federal Triangle complex of buildings. However, disagreements among the three planning bodies overseeing the project (Commission on Fine Arts, Public Buildings Commission, and U.S. Treasury) proved so fundamental that a year-long delay ensued. To end the disagreement, a Board of Architectural Consultants was created on May 19, 1927, to advise the groups on the development of the project. Assistant Secretary of the Treasury Charles S. Dewey recommended Ayres as one of the consultants, and his appointment was almost immediately approved. Design work on all buildings was postponed in May 1927 to allow the Board to conduct its work. The Board of Architectural Consultants first met on May 23, 1927, at which time it considered a plan to create a single building ringing Federal Triangle rather than six to eight individual structures. In June 1927, Ayres and the other consultants approved construction of the Department of Commerce and Internal Revenue Service structures as stand-alone buildings on the previously proposed sites. A month later, Ayres and the other Board members proposed constructing eight buildings, connected by plazas, semi-circular colonnades, and other architectural and landscaping elements. The Department of Commerce building was set on the west side of 15th Street NW between B and D Streets NW.

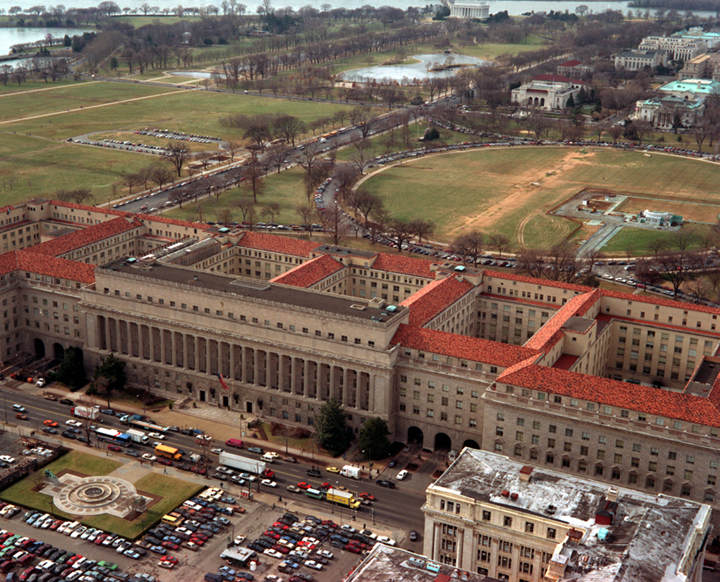
An aerial view looking west at the Herbert Hoover Dept. of Commerce building, designed by Louis Ayres

For the architectural style of the buildings, Ayres and the other Board members relied heavily on recommendation of the 1902 McMillan Plan that federal buildings in the District of Columbia be built in the Neoclassical style. Both the Board and Treasury Secretary Mellon rejected the Modern style then heavily in vogue. Rather than a mass of tall, imposing buildings, two unifying open spaces (intended for ceremonial use, and under discussion by the Board at least by March 1928) would be utilized. The first would be a Circular Plaza (inspired by the Place Vendôme) bisected by 12th Street NW, and which would require the demolition of the Old Post Office Pavilion. The second would be a rectangular Grand Plaza on the east side of 14th Street NW between the proposed Department of Commerce building (west side of 14th Street NW) and the proposed Post Office Department building (east side of 13th Street NW). The construction of the Grand Plaza would have required the demolition of the District Building.

York and Sawyer was commissioned to design the Commerce building. This choice had been made almost 15 years earlier, oddly enough. A new headquarters for the Department of Commerce had been proposed in 1912 and a contract for the design work awarded to the architectural firm of York and Sawyer. Although this building was never built, Congress honored the contract and in the Public Buildings Act named the firm again as the Commerce building's designer. York and Sawyer put Louis Ayres in charge of the building's design. But not all design choices were left up to Ayres. By March 1927, government officials had already decided that the Commerce building should be 1,000 feet (300 m) long—making it the then-largest building in the District of Columbia. Work on the building site was expected to begin by March 31, 1927. Survey work at the site began on that date even though final plans for the project were still unclear. But the May 1927 work moratorium put all decisions regarding the Commerce building design on hold. In September 1927, the Commission of Fine Arts met to discuss proposed plans for both the Commerce and Internal Revenue buildings.

Even though he was designing the Commerce building, Ayres continued to participate in the work of the Board of Architectural Consultants. He and the other Board members reviewed all designs for the Federal Triangle project in the fall of 1927, and demolition work began on the Commerce site in September 1927.

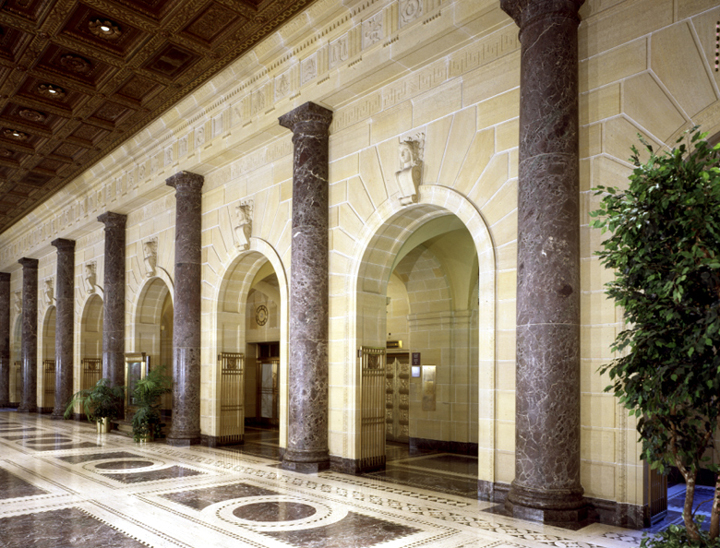
Detail of the Main Lobby of the U.S. Dept. of Commerce building, designed by Louis Ayres and with interior decoration by Barnet Phillips

By mid-1927, Ayres was proposing a grandiose building to anchor the western end of Federal Triangle. The proposed building had 1,605,066 square feet (149,115.5 m^{2}) of interior space (more than 60 percent larger than originally planned). The structure was essentially rectangular, with seven wings and six interior courtyards that was one city block wide and three blocks long. There were 15 entrances and 16 interior stairways. Its seven stories were clad in granite and limestone. More than 8 miles (13 km) of corridors accessed 37 acres (15 ha) of office space designed to house 10,000 workers, accommodate 8 million patents in a publicly accessible manner, include a public aquarium with 40 tanks and 2,000 fish, and house a 200,000-item library. Ayres asked James Earle Fraser (sculptor), a sculptor and colleague on the Commission of Fine Arts, to design and sculpt the various external features of the building. At first Fraser said he had far too many other commissions and could not work on the Commerce building, but Ayres and Fraser developed a cooperative work style that eventually was adopted for most of the buildings in the Federal Triangle: Fraser consulted with Ayres and other architects to develop appropriate themes and content and then built or fashioned models of his designs. Then his assistants enlarged the models into full-scale sculptures and did the physical work of actually carving the art. Ayres designed four massive pediments for the building, which Fraser filled with sculptures with the themes "Aviation," "Mining," "Fisheries," and "Foreign and Domestic Commerce." Ayres contracted with interior designer Barnet Phillips to design and implement the interior elements of the building. Ayres had planned a main lobby that was Neoclassical in design. Phillips designed rusticated walls, placed arches over every doorway, placed Doric columns throughout the lobby, added a painted and coffered ceiling, and laid terrazzo and marble down for the lobby floor.

Ayres confronted a vitally important design problem concerning the nature of the soil. Due to the formerly marshy condition of the soil and the existence of several submerged streams nearby, Ayres designed a structure that would stand on more than 18,000 pilings. However, water pressure from the submerged Tiber Creek would make it difficult to drive the piles. Ayres and his team devised a plan whereby a deep-sea diver descended into the underground Tiber Creek and drilled a hole 20 feet (6.1 m) deep into the earth. A hose would be inserted into the hole, and water pumped from the earth until the water table dropped and the driving of the piles could be accomplished. The building's foundation was more than three feet thick in places in order to withstand the hydraulic pressure put on it by the submerged Tiber Creek. Water from the Tiber was utilized as an air conditioning system to cool the building.

Ayres submitted his design for the Commerce building to the Public Buildings Commission, which gave its approval on November 1, 1927. The previous size of the building was reaffirmed. Excavation of the site began on November 21, 1927. However, although Ayres had proposed an Italian Renaissance style for the Commerce building, few of the other building proposals had adopted a classical design. On November 25, 1927, the Commission on Fine Arts adopted a requirement that all the Federal Triangle buildings have a "uniform appearance" and height (six stories), limiting the Board's design deliberations (and Ayres' proposal for the Commerce building). Treasury Secretary Andrew W. Mellon imposed a requirement in December 1927 that all the buildings be built in the Neoclassical architectural style. Ayres modified the exterior design of his structure accordingly.

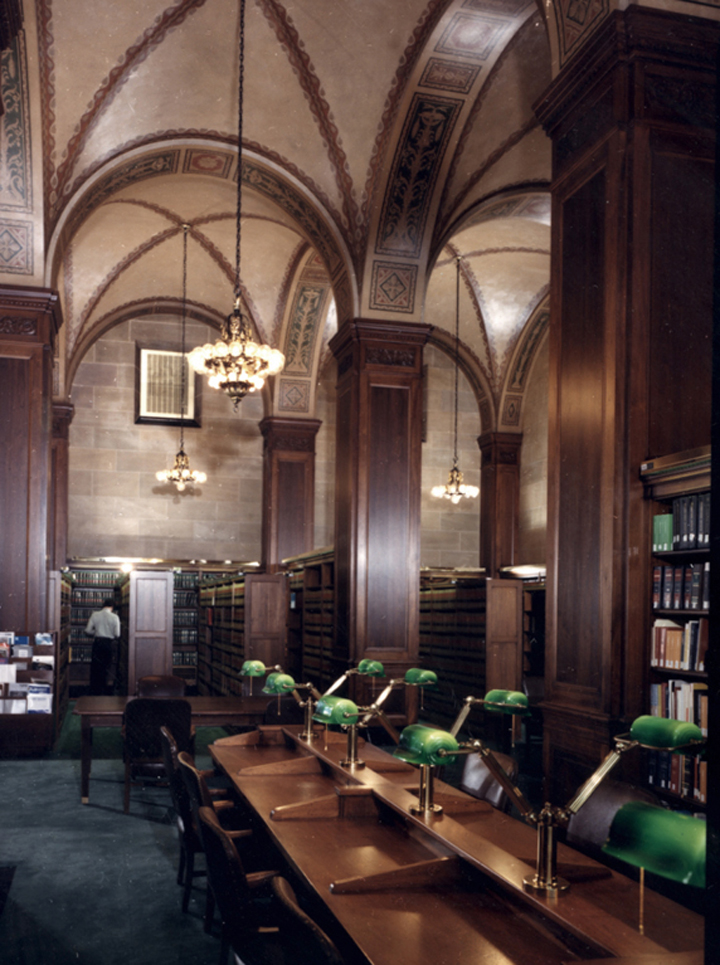
Research Library of the U.S. Dept. of Commerce building, designed by Louis Ayres and with interior decoration by Barnet Phillips

By March 1928, newspapers were reporting that the Commerce and Internal Revenue buildings would be constructed first. Ayres' design, however, was still in flux, as the Board of Architectural Consultants refused to give its approval to his plan. Although the size of the Commerce building had stabilized by March 1928, some Board members still suggested that both 15th and 14th Streets NW be submerged in tunnels beneath the structure. Despite the ongoing dispute over the design, additional demolition contracts were awarded for the site in April 1928.

The Board of Architectural Consultants and Ayres met in July 1928 to consider ways in which the construction program might be sped up, and devised plans to have four approved buildings (Internal Revenue, Justice, Labor, and Ayres' Commerce structure) completed by 1932. By October 1928, the Board of Architectural Consultants had agreed with prior decisions that no office building should be constructed on the National Mall, and that this space should be reserved for museums.

Ayres' design faced one final hurdle in the fall of 1929. Although the Board unveiled its proposed design for the project in April 1929, the design still lacked a unifying architectural look. Subsequently, John Russell Pope was asked in September 1929 to bring a more uniform style to the buildings. Nonetheless, within this more uniform approach, a variety of styles could be used, and were: Italian Renaissance for the Department of Commerce building, Corinthian for the National Archives building, and Ionic for the Post Office Department.

Meanwhile, Ayres and the Board of Architectural Consultants worked with sculptors, painters, and others to design more than 100 statues, fountains, bronze doors, murals, plaques, and panels (both interior and exterior) throughout the complex.

Ayres was involved in approving two major changes to Federal Triangle in early 1930. The Board and other planning groups had long agreed to site the Justice Department building on the block bounded by 7th, 9th, and B Streets NW and Pennsylvania Avenue NW. But this plan changed in March 1930. Architect John Russell Pope made a proposal to have the Justice and Archives buildings switch sites so that the Justice building would have more space. Although the change would entail major design alterations in both buildings, Secretary Mellon favored the idea. The Commission on Fine Arts approved the plan, and Mellon met with the Board of Architectural Consultants in late March 1930 to discuss the idea. Although this initial meeting left the issue unresolved, Ayres and the Board later agreed to Mellon's wishes in April and the two buildings switched plots.

President (and former Commerce Secretary) Herbert Hoover laid the cornerstone of the Commerce building on June 10, 1929, using the same trowel President George Washington had used to lay the cornerstone of the U.S. Capitol. The contract for its limestone facade—according to at least one newspaper account, the largest stone contract in world history—was awarded in April. The cost of the building had risen to $17.5 million. Ayres' Department of Commerce building opened on January 4, 1932.

Ayres continued his work on the Board of Architectural Consultants into the mid-1930s. From 1931 to 1936, the Board struggled to accommodate the need for automobile parking at the complex while also making Federal Triangle pedestrian-friendly. The Board began studying traffic issues in late 1927. A major study of parking needs and solutions was conducted in 1931, and traffic and parking patterns assessed again after the Department of Commerce building opened in early 1932. To achieve some of the traffic and parking goals, Ayres and the Board voted to eliminate the east-west streets and diagonal avenues, leaving only the north-south streets through the area, and 12th and 9th Streets NW were submerged in tunnels beneath the National Mall. In the first major change to the Board's "final" plan of 1929, a proposed "Grand Plaza" between the Commerce and Post Office buildings was abandoned in favor of a parking lot. The Board considered a number of other solutions to the need to accommodate the more than 7,500 cars expected to arrive every day (including an underground bus terminal and underground parking garage under the Grand Plaza), but in the end only approved a small number of underground parking spaces beneath the Apex Building.

The New York Chapter of the American Institute of Architects awarded him its Medal of Honor in 1933. In 1936, he was elected to the National Academy of Design.

He wed Mrs. Edith Twining (née Donald, widow of Major Kinsley Twining) On November 28, 1928. He became stepfather to Twining's son and daughter, and his stepson Kinsley Twining became American vice-consul in Singapore.

=== Notable buildings and memorials ===
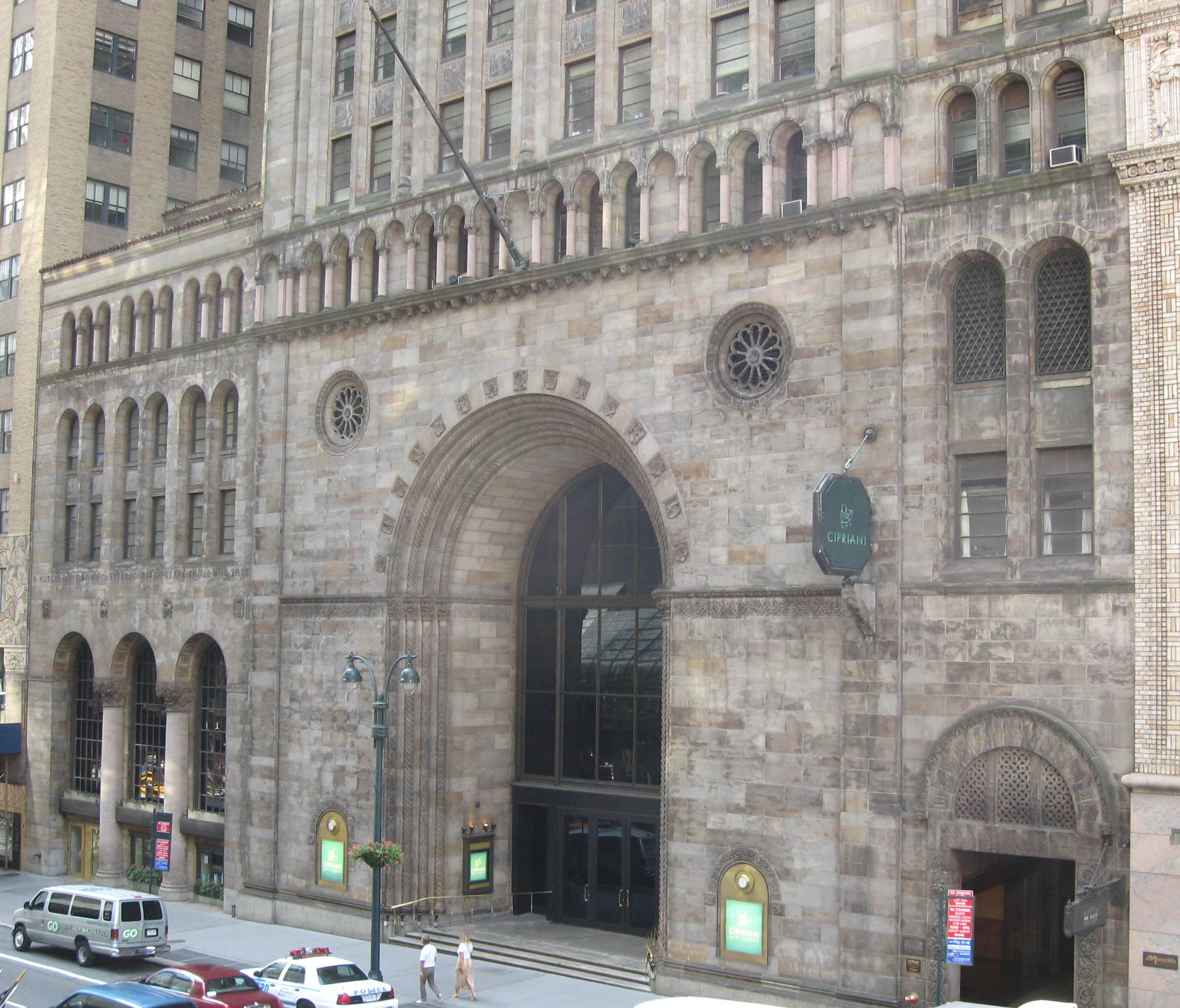
Bowery Savings Bank building, designed by Louis Ayres

Among Ayres' more recognized and important buildings are:

- Bowery Savings Bank, 110 East 42nd Street between Park and Lexington Avenues across from Grand Central Terminal
- Brick Presbyterian Church
- Broadway Savings Bank
- Guaranty Trust Company building
- Herbert C. Hoover United States Department of Commerce building
- New York Academy of Medicine building
- Rockefeller Hospital
- United States Memorial Chapel at the Meuse-Argonne American Cemetery and Memorial

His Bowery Savings Bank building is particularly notable. The structure has "one of the great interior spaces of New York", according to one architectural guide.

Ayres' was not only a noted architect in his own right, but he helped lead many successful design teams as well. His teams won for York & Sawyer commissions for the Federal Building in Honolulu, Hawaii, (since replaced by the Prince Kuhio Federal Building) and 33 Liberty Street, Manhattan, New York City (the Federal Reserve Bank of New York building).

== Death ==
Just before his death, Louis Ayres was commissioned to lead a team which would draft a master plan for the expansion of Rutgers University. After a long period of poor health, Ayres died at his home in Manhattan on November 30, 1947. His wife and two stepchildren survived him.
