= Wisconsin Territorial Centennial half dollar =

1936 United States commemorative coin

- United States
- Value: 50 cents (0.50 US dollars)
- Mass: 12.5 g
- Diameter: 30.61 mm (1.20 in)
- Thickness: 2.15 mm (0.08 in)
- Edge: Reeded (Note: The edge is ridged, or milled.)
- Composition: 90.0% silver 10.0% copper
- Silver: 0.36169 troy oz
- Years of minting: 1936
- Mintage: 25,015 including 15 pieces for the Assay Commission
- Mint marks: None, all pieces struck at Philadelphia Mint without mint mark

Obverse
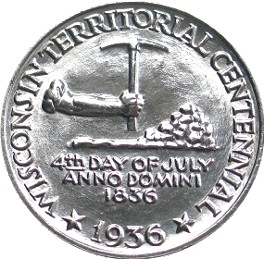
- Design: Arm holding pickaxe with lead ore
- Designer: David Parsons and Benjamin Hawkins
- Design date: 1936

Reverse
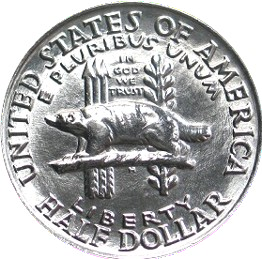
- Design: Badger, three arrows, and an olive branch
- Designer: David Parsons and Benjamin Hawkins
- Design date: 1936

The Wisconsin Territorial Centennial half dollar is a commemorative half dollar designed by David Parsons and Benjamin Hawkins and minted by the United States Bureau of the Mint in 1936. The obverse depicts a pick axe and lead ore, referring to the lead mining in early Wisconsin, while the reverse depicts a badger and the territorial seal.

Organizers of the territorial centennial celebration sought a commemorative half dollar as a fundraiser; at this time newly issued commemorative coins found a ready market from collectors and speculators. Accordingly, legislation was introduced by Senator Robert M. La Follette Jr., which, though it was amended, passed Congress without opposition. When initial designs by Parsons were rejected by the Commission of Fine Arts, Hawkins was hired, and he executed the designs, though Parsons was also given credit.

A total of 25,000 pieces were coined for public sale in July 1936. This did not occur until after the centennial celebrations had ended, and though the coins were promoted during them, sales were weak and the coins were sold by the Wisconsin Historical Society until the supply was exhausted in the late 1950s. The coins currently catalog for up to $250.

== Background ==
The state of Wisconsin, before its admission to the Union in 1848, was a territory. Much of the Wisconsin Territory had been part of the Northwest Territory, ceded by Great Britain in 1783 as part of the Treaty of Paris. The area then became part of the Michigan Territory, and gained importance during the 1820s, when large deposits of lead (commemorated on the obverse of the coin) were discovered in southwestern Wisconsin. Many of these early miners chose to live in their shafts, rather than building a separate house, leading to the nickname "badgers" for Wisconsinites. As more Americans moved in, the area became important enough to become a separate territory in 1836. Its first governor, Henry Dodge, was sworn in on July 4, 1836.

Sparked by low-mintage issues which appreciated in value, the market for United States commemorative coins spiked in 1936. Until 1954, the entire mintage of such issues was sold by the government at face value to a group authorized by Congress, who then tried to sell the coins at a profit to the public. The new pieces then came on to the secondary market, and in early 1936 all earlier commemoratives sold at a premium to their issue prices. The apparent easy profits to be made by purchasing and holding commemoratives attracted many to the coin collecting hobby, where they sought to purchase the new issues. Congress authorized an explosion of commemorative coins in 1936; no fewer than 15 were issued for the first time. At the request of the groups authorized to purchase them, several coins minted in prior years were produced again, dated 1936, senior among them the Oregon Trail Memorial half dollar, first struck in 1926.

In order to help fund various activities for the Wisconsin Centennial that year, the Wisconsin Centennial Commission appointed a Coinage Committee to call for commemorative half dollars commemorating the Centennial. This committee had been formed in February 1935, in part due to suggestions from the Madison Coin Club. As 1936 was the peak year for commemorative coins, the fact that a territorial centennial was hardly worthy of commemoration on United States coinage due to being of local or regional significance was not taken into consideration. As numismatic author Q. David Bowers put it, "the establishment of the territorial government [was] a rather obscure event to observe with a nationally-distributed coin". Numismatist Bob Bair, writing in 2021, deemed the Wisconsin Centennial "one of the many events of strictly local interest in the 1920s and 1930s that, with the assistance of Congress and the U.S. Mint, used commemorative coinage to enhance their revenue".

== Legislation ==
Fred W. Harris of the Coinage Committee interested one of Wisconsin's senators, Robert M. La Follette Jr., in the coinage proposal. La Follette introduced legislation for a Wisconsin Territorial half dollar in the United States Senate on January 30, 1936; it was referred to the Committee on Banking and Currency. There, it was one of several commemorative coin bills to be considered on March 11, 1936, by a subcommittee led by Colorado's Alva B. Adams. (Note: In addition to the Wisconsin piece, they were: the Delaware Tercentenary half dollar, Bridgeport Centennial half dollar, Rhode Island Tercentenary half dollar, New Rochelle 250th Anniversary half dollar, House and Senate versions of the Long Island Tercentenary half dollar, and an unsuccessful proposal for a half dollar honoring William Henry Harrison. In addition, there was a proposal for a new design for the multi-year Arkansas Centennial half dollar, which would pass, and a similar request for the Texas Centennial half dollar, which would fail alongside bills for commemorative medals for Jefferson Davis and Robert E. Lee, a proposal to revive the three-cent nickel, and a bill to declare it the policy of the U.S. to strike commemorative medals instead of commemorative coins.)

Senator Adams had heard of the commemorative coin abuses of the mid-1930s, with issuers increasing the number of coins needed for a complete set by having them issued at different mints with different mint marks; authorizing legislation placed no prohibition on this. Lyman W. Hoffecker, a Texas coin dealer and official of the American Numismatic Association, testified and told the subcommittee that some issues, like the Oregon Trail half dollar, had been issued over the course of years with different dates and mint marks. Other issues had been entirely bought up by single dealers, and some low-mintage varieties of commemorative coins were selling at high prices. The many varieties and inflated prices for some issues that resulted from these practices angered coin collectors trying to keep their collections current.

The Wisconsin bill emerged from the committee on March 26, 1936, with a report authored by Adams. The original bill would have allowed the Wisconsin committee selling the coins to decide how many would be struck, and they could be struck at any or all of the mints. Instead, the amendments required that they be struck at only one mint, that no fewer than 5,000 be struck at one time, and that they be issued within a year of the passage of the legislation, with all dated with the year of enactment. The Senate passed the bill on March 27, 1936, the fourth of six commemorative coin bills considered in succession, each passed without debate or dissent. (Note: They were, in order, the Delaware Tercentenary half dollar, the Bridgeport, Connecticut, Centennial half dollar, the Cleveland Centennial half dollar, the Wisconsin Territorial Centennial half dollar, the New Rochelle 250th Anniversary half dollar and the Long Island Tercentenary half dollar.)

The bill then went to the House of Representatives, and was referred to the Committee on Coinage, Weights, and Measures. On April 16, 1936, that committee reported back through Andrew Somers of New York, recommending it pass after being amended to increase the minimum number struck at one time from 5,000 to 25,000, thus setting the minimum mintage at 25,000. The House of Representatives passed the bill, with the committee amendments and without debate or dissent, on April 28, 1936, on the motion of Wisconsin's Gardner R. Withrow.

As the two houses had not passed identical versions, this sent the bill back to the Senate. On May 4, Adams moved that the Senate agree to the House amendment, which it did; the bill became law, authorizing not fewer than 25,000 legal-tender Wisconsin half dollars, with the signature of President Franklin D. Roosevelt on May 15, 1936. Under the terms of the authorizing legislation, there was no upper limit to the number of coins that could be struck, so long as they were taken in tranches of not less than 25,000 coins, were of a single design dated 1936, and were issued by the government by May 15, 1937, one year from the bill's enactment.

== Preparation ==
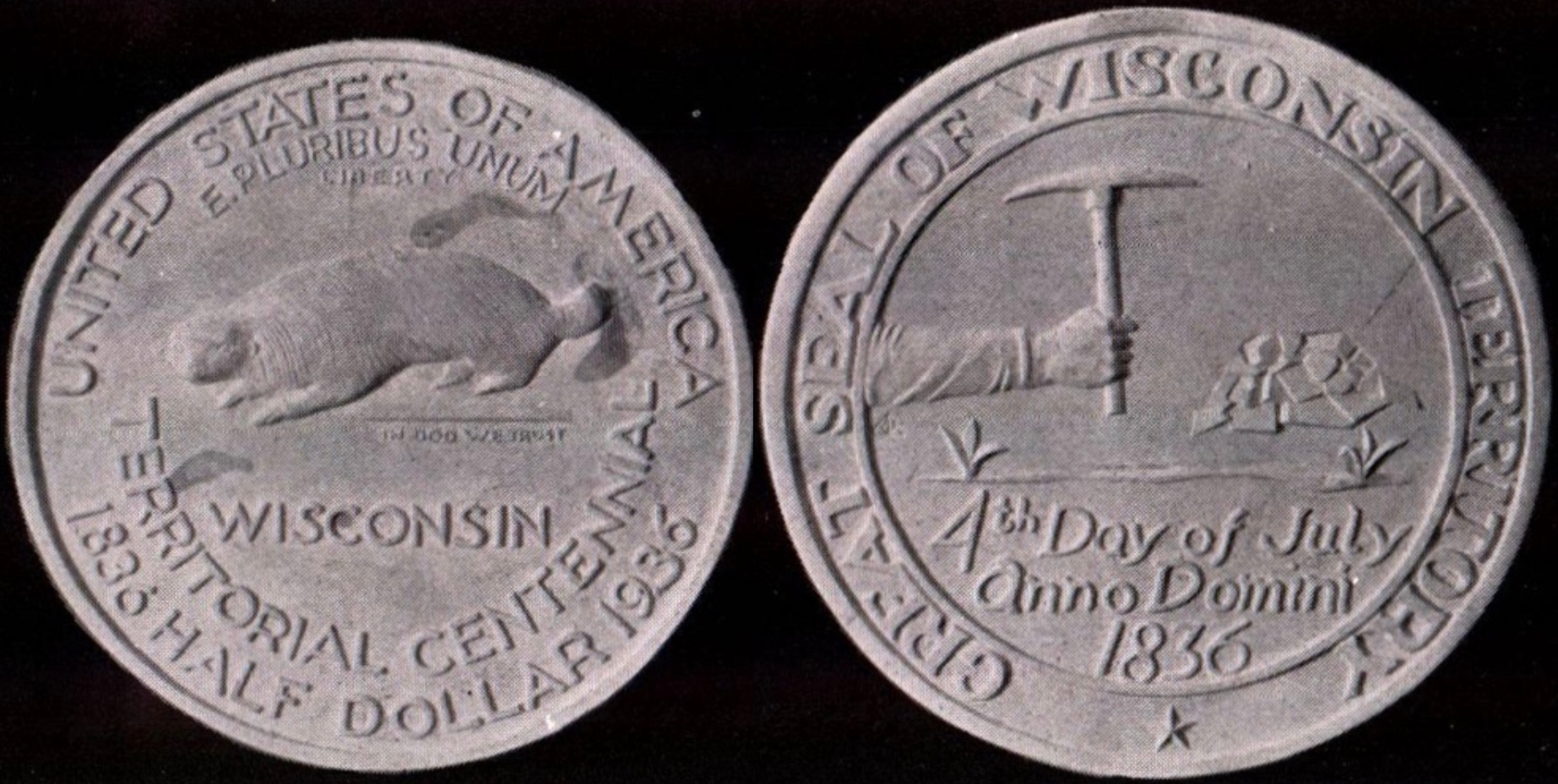
Parsons's models for the half dollar

In April 1936, with the bill still before Congress, the Wisconsin Centennial Commission selected David Parsons, a local art student, to design the coin, dictating that the seal of the Wisconsin Territory be used for one side, and a badger for the other. The models were poorly executed and in very high relief; they were rejected by the Bureau of the Mint. The Commission asked for the name of a suitable artist, and the Treasury Department referred the issue to the Commission of Fine Arts (CFA), which then recruited New York sculptor Benjamin Hawkins. The CFA was charged by a 1921 executive order by President Harding with rendering advisory opinions on public artworks, including coins.

On May 14, 1936, the CFA chair, Charles Moore, wrote to Hawkins informing him of the Centennial Commission's requirements and enclosing a copy of the territorial seal. He told Hawkins that the Centennial Commission expected the work to be done within three weeks. Hawkins submitted the finished models to the Mint on June 3, 1936, which were approved by the CFA two days later. The models were reduced to coin-size hubs by the Medallic Art Company of New York.

Numismatic author Don Taxay felt it unjust that Parsons and Hawkins are given joint credit for the coin, since Hawkins did not work from Parsons's designs, but from the territorial seal, and the Hawkins badger was completely different from that of Parsons. Taxay deemed the crediting of Parsons symptomatic of the desire of such commissions to associate their work with local artists.

== Design ==
The obverse is an inexact rendering of the territorial seal. A miner's forearm, holding a pickaxe, dominates the design, with a pile of lead ore and soil in the background. This represents the mining activities in southeast Wisconsin that drew many settlers to the area in the 1820s. The date mentioned, July 4, 1836, is that on which the first governor, Dodge, took office. The date of the coin and WISCONSIN TERRITORIAL CENTENNIAL ring the design.

The reverse features a badger, the Wisconsin state animal. Behind it are three arrows, symbolic of the conflict between settlers and the Black Hawk Indians, with an olive branch, marking the peace that paved the way for the establishment of the territory, or, as Anthony Swiatek and Walter Breen put it in their 1988 book on commemorative coins, "the massacre and expulsion of the Indians that made the area safe for white settlers". The name of the country, the coin's denomination, and the inscriptions required by law surround the pictorial design. Hawkins's initial H appears below the badger, which represents Wisconsin's early fur-trading days; both sides of the half dollar emphasize the natural resources of the state.

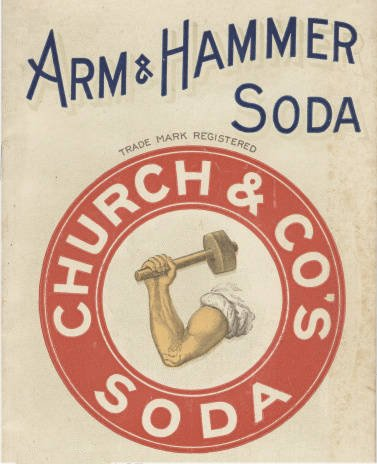
Church and Co's soda logo c. 1904

According to Bowers "The design was not a favorite with collectors, and relatively little enthusiasm was ever shown for it." Taxay deemed the Wisconsin coin "one of our poorest issues". Cornelius Vermeule, an art historian who wrote a book on American coins and medals, disliked the Wisconsin half dollar and compared its design to that on a box of baking soda.

The coin of 1936 that marks the hundredth anniversary of Wisconsin's formation as a territory smacks of amateurism. The models were the work of an art student at the University of Wisconsin ... This half dollar of the United States is, as a work of art, little more than a high school medal of the dullest variety. As a visual experience, it ranks with some of the worst local-society or small-occasion medals which have a timelessness if only in the mediocre level of their art.

== Distribution and collecting ==
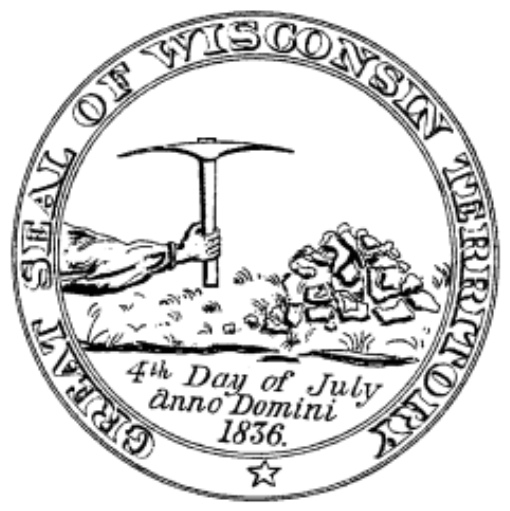
The seal of Wisconsin Territory

The Coinage Committee was confident enough that the authorizing legislation would become law that Harris, who served as the coin's distributor, began accepting orders in April 1936, a month before the bill passed. While the legislation authorizing the commemorative called for a minimum mintage of 25,000 coins with no limit on the maximum number of coins that could be minted, Harris chose to take a conservative approach and minted only 25,015 coins, which included 15 coins put aside for examination and testing at the 1937 meeting of the annual Assay Commission. These were struck at the Philadelphia Mint in July 1936. Although the coins were unlikely to have been available during the Wisconsin Centennial celebration from June 27 to July 5, most were sold for $1.50 per coin by mail order through the work of the committee. The coin was marketed during the Centennial Cavalcade of Wisconsin, a historical pageant that could be seen from June 27 to July 5, 1936, at Camp Randall Stadium, the University of Wisconsin's football stadium.

The coin was mentioned favorably in Wisconsin local newspapers, which claimed that the issue had immediately sold out due to orders from far and wide. However, due to their late release and primarily local appeal, the coins did not sell very well, and many remained unsold by the end of 1936. They continued to be sold for the next 16 years by the Wisconsin Historical Society at the reduced price of $1.25 per coin, until the price was raised to $3 per coin in 1952. The supply of coins eventually was exhausted in the late 1950s.

The coins were sold in plain cardboard holders that, similar to holders for the York County, Maine, Tercentenary half dollar, contained slots for up to five coins. Orders of one or two coins were sealed in tissue paper and shipped in envelopes that were either imprinted "L.M. HANKS, FIRST NATIONAL BANK BUILDING, MADISON, WISC" or rubber-stamped "AFTER 10 DAYS RETURN TO STATE SUPERINTENDENT, STATE CAPITOL, MADISON, WISC". Like the coins, envelopes are collectibles, valued at $50–$75.

The Wisconsin piece in uncirculated condition sold for about $1.25 by 1940, up to $3.00 by 1950, $14 by 1960, and $325 by 1985. The deluxe edition of R. S. Yeoman's A Guide Book of United States Coins, published in 2020, lists the coin for $175 to $250, depending on condition. A specimen in exceptional condition sold for $17,625 in 2015.

== Sources ==
- Bair, Bob (September 2021). "A coin and a medal for Wisconsin". The Numismatist. American Numismatic Association: 41–45.
- Bowers, Q. David (1992). Commemorative Coins of the United States: A Complete Encyclopedia. Wolfeboro, NH: Bowers and Merena Galleries, Inc. ISBN 978-0-943161-35-8.
- Bullowa, David M. (1938). "The Commemorative Coinage of the United States 1892–1938". Numismatic Notes and Monographs (83). New York: American Numismatic Society: i–192. JSTOR 43607181.
- Flynn, Kevin (2008). The Authoritative Reference on Commemorative Coins 1892–1954. Roswell, GA: Kyle Vick. OCLC 711779330.
- Swiatek, Anthony (2012). Encyclopedia of the Commemorative Coins of the United States. Chicago, IL: KWS Publishers. ISBN 978-0-9817736-7-4.
- Swiatek, Anthony; Breen, Walter (1981). The Encyclopedia of United States Silver & Gold Commemorative Coins, 1892 to 1954. New York, NY: Arco Publishing. ISBN 978-0-668-04765-4.
- Taxay, Don (1967). An Illustrated History of U.S. Commemorative Coinage. New York, NY: Arco Publishing. ISBN 978-0-668-01536-3.
- United States House of Representatives Committee on Coinage, Weights, and Measures (April 16, 1936). Authorize the Coinage of 50-Cent Pieces in Commemoration of the One-Hundredth Anniversary of the Establishment of the Territorial Government of Wisconsin, and to Assist in the Celebration of the Wisconsin Centennial During the Year of 1936 (PDF). United States Government Printing Office.
- United States Senate Committee on Banking and Currency (March 11, 1936). Coinage of commemorative 50-cent pieces. United States Government Printing Office.
- United States Senate Committee on Banking and Currency (March 26, 1936). Authorize the Coinage of 50-cent Pieces in Commemoration of the One-Hundredth Anniversary of the Statehood of Wisconsin, and to Assist in the Celebration of the Wisconsin Centennial During the Year of 1936 (PDF).
- Vermeule, Cornelius (1971). Numismatic Art in America. Cambridge, MA: The Belknap Press of Harvard University Press. ISBN 978-0-674-62840-3.
- Yeoman, R. S. (2020). A Guide Book of United States Coins (Mega Red 5th ed.). Atlanta, GA: Whitman Publishing, LLC. ISBN 978-0-7948-4705-0.
