= Bridgeport, Connecticut, Centennial half dollar =

1936 US commemorative coin

- United States
- Value: 50 cents (0.50 US dollars)
- Mass: 12.5 g
- Diameter: 30.61 mm (1.20 in)
- Thickness: 2.15 mm (0.08 in)
- Edge: Reeded
- Composition: 90.0% silver; 10.0% copper
- Silver: 0.36169 troy oz
- Years of minting: 1936
- Mintage: 25,015
- Mint marks: None, all pieces struck at Philadelphia Mint without mint mark.

Obverse
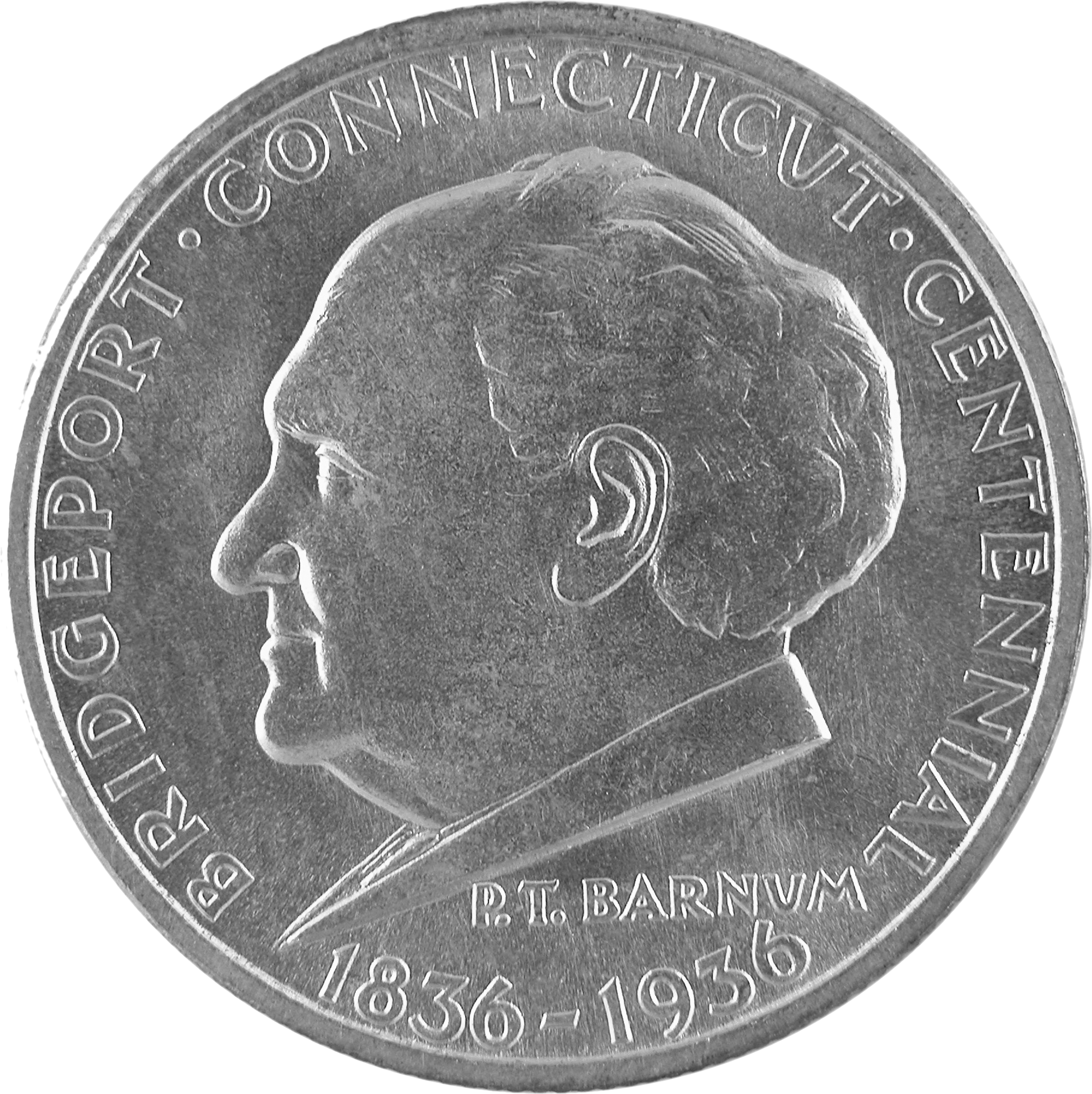
- Design: P. T. Barnum
- Designer: Henry Kreis
- Design date: 1936

Reverse
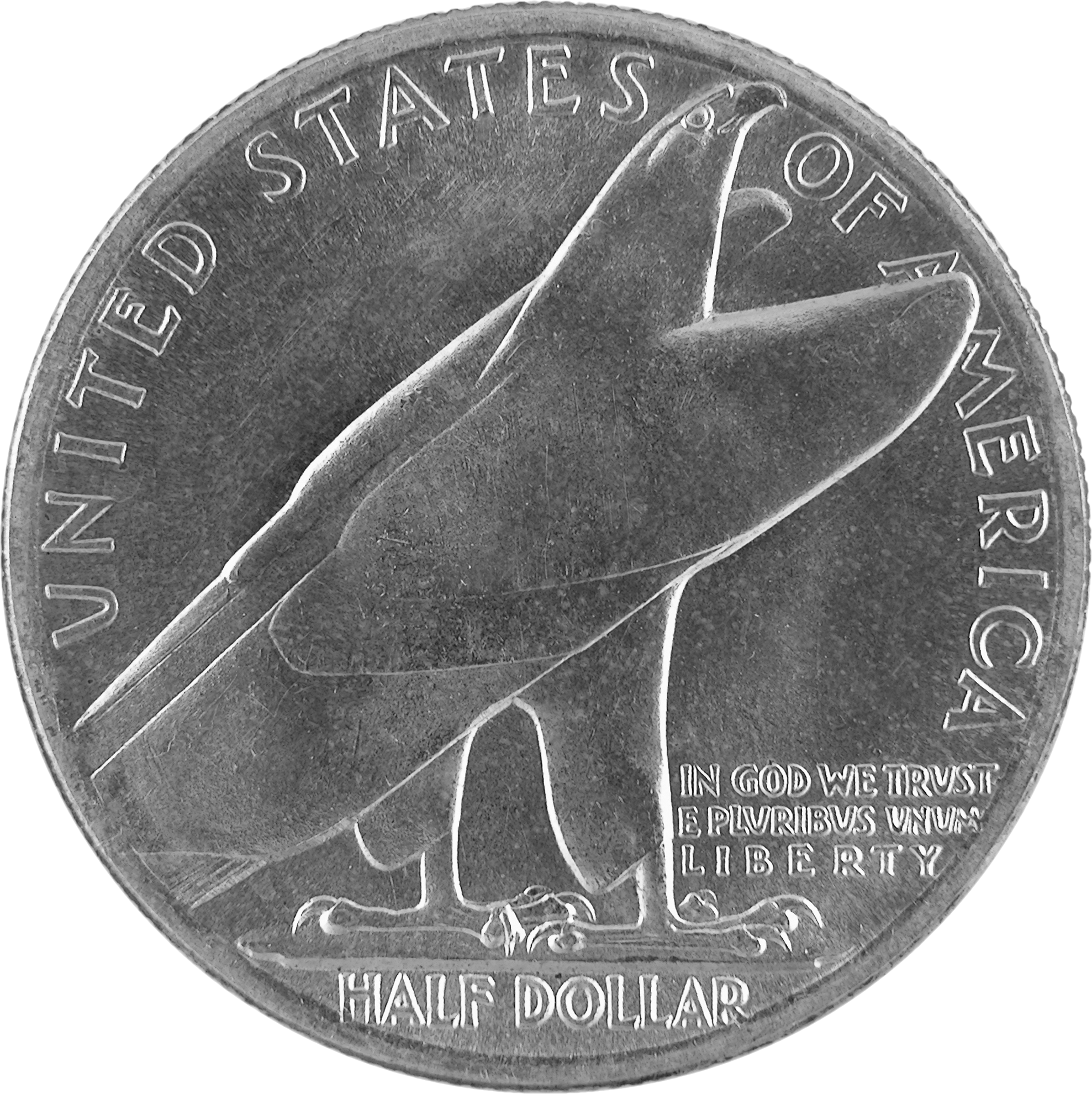
- Design: Stylized eagle
- Designer: Henry Kreis
- Design date: 1936

The Bridgeport, Connecticut, Centennial half dollar (also the Bridgeport Centennial half dollar or Bridgeport half dollar) is a commemorative fifty-cent piece issued in 1936 by the United States Bureau of the Mint to honor the 100th anniversary of the incorporation of Bridgeport, Connecticut, as a city. Designed by Henry Kreis, the obverse depicts the showman P. T. Barnum, who was one of Bridgeport's most famous residents, was mayor of the city, helped develop it, and is buried there. The reverse depicts a stylized eagle.

Bridgeport authorities wanted a commemorative coin to help fund the centennial celebrations. At the time, Congress was authorizing such coins for even local events, and the Bridgeport half dollar legislation passed Congress without opposition. Kreis had designed the Connecticut Tercentenary half dollar (1935), and he produced designs showing a left-facing Barnum and a modernistic eagle similar to the one on the Connecticut piece.

The coins were vended to the public beginning in September 1936 at a price of $2. Too late for most of the centennial celebrations, the coins nevertheless sold well, though leaving an unsold remainder of several thousand pieces. These were bought up by coin dealers and wholesale quantities were available on the secondary market until the 1970s. The Bridgeport half dollar sells in the low hundreds of dollars, depending on condition.

== Background ==
Bridgeport, the largest city in Connecticut, was named after a drawbridge that local residents were proud of. Settled in 1639, it was an important center during the 17th and 18th centuries, but was not incorporated as a city until 1836. Elias Howe, inventor of the modern sewing machine, built a factory there.

Among Bridgeport's famous residents was P. T. Barnum, the showman, who became mayor of the city, served in the Connecticut Legislature, and is buried there. He endowed the (now defunct) Barnum Museum of Natural History at Tufts University in Massachusetts, but as numismatic writer Arlie Slabaugh Jr. put it, "his greatest monument is the circus. Don't you see that sawdust ring, hear the calliope?" The Ringling Bros. and Barnum & Bailey Circus survived until 2017.

Until 1954, the entire mintage of each commemorative coin issue was sold by the government at face value to a group named by Congress in authorizing legislation, who then tried to sell the coins at a profit to the public. The new pieces then entered the secondary market, and in early 1936 all earlier commemoratives sold at a premium to their issue prices. The apparent easy profits to be made by purchasing and holding commemoratives attracted many to the coin collecting hobby, where they sought to purchase the new issues. The growing market for such pieces led to many commemorative coin proposals in Congress, to mark anniversaries and benefit (it was hoped) worthy causes, including some of purely local significance. Among these were the Bridgeport piece, intended to fund local celebrations of the city's centennial; the designated group was Bridgeport Centennial, Inc., in charge of the celebrations.

== Legislation ==
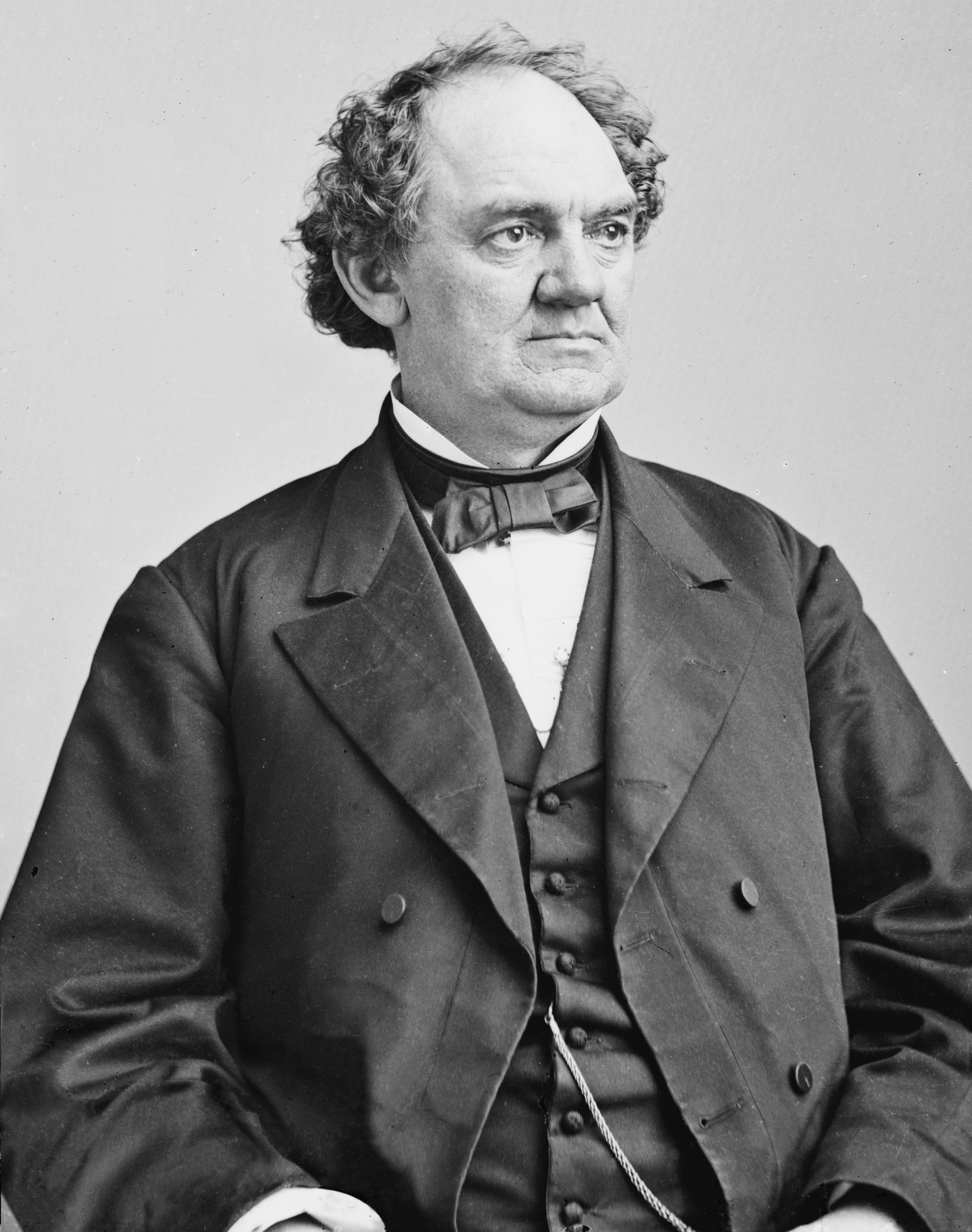
P. T. Barnum

A bill for a Bridgeport Centennial half dollar was introduced into the United States Senate by Augustine Lonergan of Connecticut on March 10, 1936. The other Connecticut senator, Francis T. Maloney, had been asked three or four weeks previously to introduce the bill, but Senator Maloney had chosen not to do so because of the many commemorative coin bills already before the Senate. The Bridgeport bill was referred to the Committee on Banking and Currency, and was one of several commemorative coin bills to be considered on March 11, 1936, by a subcommittee led by Colorado's Alva B. Adams. (Note: In addition to the Bridgeport piece, they were: the Wisconsin Territorial Centennial half dollar, Delaware Tercentenary half dollar, Rhode Island Tercentenary half dollar, New Rochelle 250th Anniversary half dollar, House and Senate versions of the Long Island Tercentenary half dollar, and an unsuccessful proposal for a half dollar honoring William Henry Harrison. In addition, there was a proposal for a new design for the multi-year Arkansas Centennial half dollar, which would pass, and a similar request for the Texas Centennial half dollar, which would fail alongside bills for commemorative medals for Jefferson Davis and Robert E. Lee, a proposal to revive the three-cent nickel, and a bill to declare it the policy of the U.S. to strike commemorative medals instead of commemorative coins.)

Senator Adams had heard of the commemorative coin abuses of the mid-1930s, with issuers increasing the number of coins needed for a complete set by having them issued at different mints with different mint marks; authorizing legislation placed no prohibition on this. Lyman W. Hoffecker, a Texas coin dealer and official of the American Numismatic Association, testified and told the subcommittee that some issues, like the Oregon Trail Memorial half dollar, first struck in 1926, had been issued over the course of years with different dates and mint marks. Other issues had been entirely bought up by single dealers, and some low-mintage varieties of commemorative coins were selling at high prices. The many varieties and inflated prices for some issues that resulted from these practices angered coin collectors trying to keep their collections current.

On March 26, Adams reported the bill back to the Senate, though with extensive amendments. The coins could only be struck at one mint; there would be a mintage limit of 10,000 coins and no fewer than 5,000 could be made at a time. They would have to be dated 1936, and Bridgeport Centennial, Inc., the organization designated to purchase the coins, had one year to do so. The net proceeds Bridgeport Centennial, Inc. received from selling the coins could only be used for the centennial observances. The bill was brought to the Senate floor on March 27, 1936, the second of six coinage bills being considered one after the other. Like the others, it was amended and passed without recorded discussion or dissent.

The bill reached the House of Representatives on April 1 and was referred to the Committee on Coinage, Weights, and Measures. That committee reported back on the 16th, recommending an amendment to require that not less than 25,000 coins be struck. The amendment deleted the language requiring 5,000 to be minted at a time, as well as the one-year time limit. On April 28, Schuyler Merritt of Connecticut brought the bill to the House floor, asking that it be passed with the recommended amendment, and it was, without any discussion or dissent.

As the two houses had not passed identical versions, this sent the bill back to the Senate. On May 4, Adams moved that the Senate agree to the House amendment, which it did; the bill became law, authorizing not fewer than 25,000 half dollars, with the signature of President Franklin D. Roosevelt on May 15, 1936. The lack of an upper mintage limit or a time limit for production meant that Bridgeport Centennial, Inc. could have ordered as many coins as it wanted as far into the future as it cared to as long as they were dated 1936. Any such authority was removed by Congress with legislation passed August 5, 1939, directing that commemorative coins authorized before March 1 of that year be no longer struck.

== Preparation ==
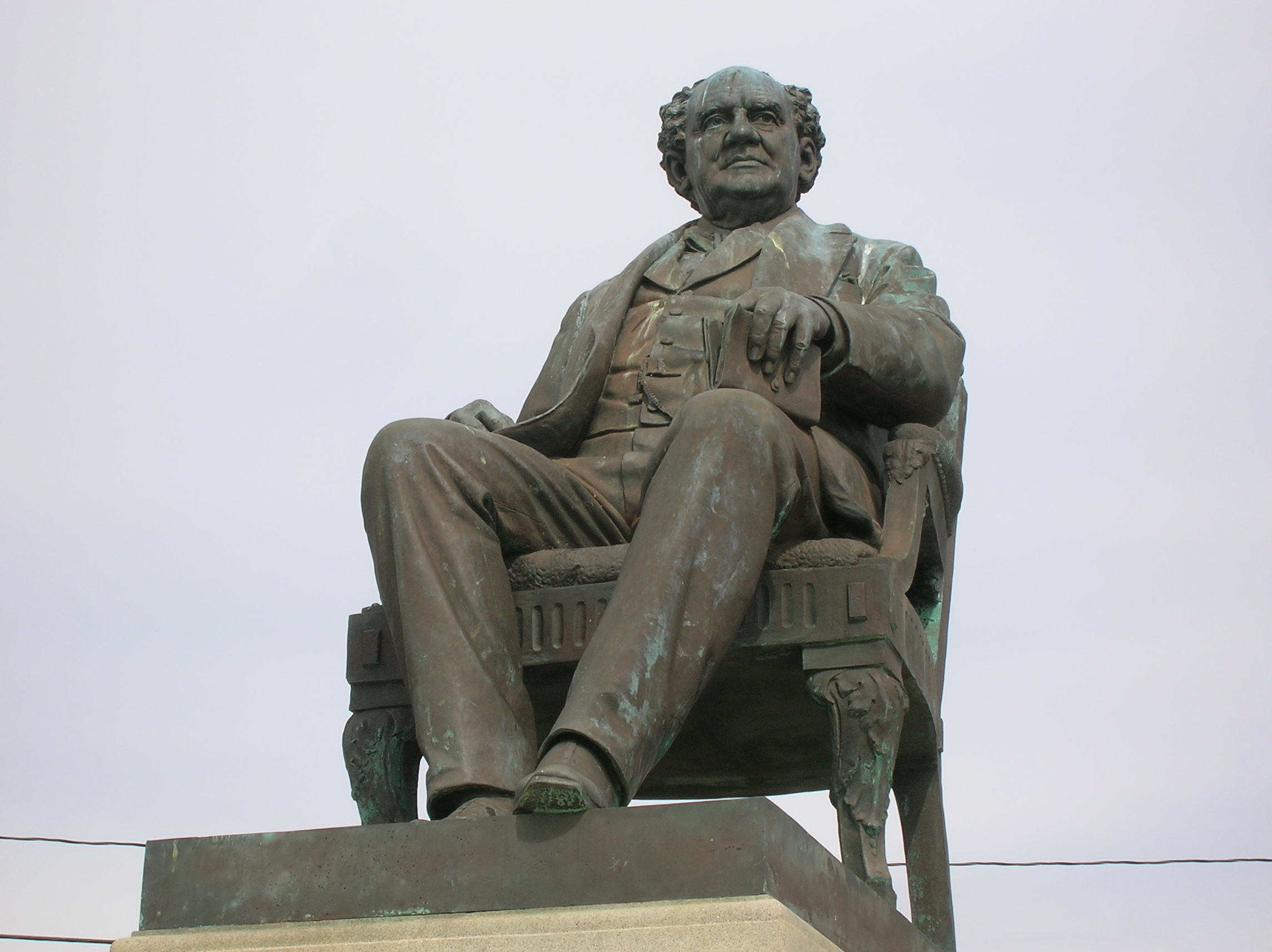
P. T. Barnum, sculpted by Thomas Ball (1887), Seaside Park, Bridgeport, Connecticut

On June 10, 1936, Bridgeport mayor Jasper McLevy wrote to Director of the United States Mint Nellie Tayloe Ross, informing her that Henry Kreis, designer of the Connecticut Tercentenary half dollar, had been hired to sculpt the Bridgeport coin, and enclosing sketches of the proposed design. McLevy noted that Barnum was the subject of one side of the coin, and explained that Barnum had presented Seaside Park to the city and had helped develop East Bridgeport. The following day, Ross wrote to Secretary of the Treasury Henry Morgenthau Jr. stating that the Bridgeport designs would be forwarded to the Commission of Fine Arts for its opinion before Morgenthau was called upon to give final approval. The commission was charged by a 1921 executive order by President Warren G. Harding with rendering advisory opinions on public artworks, including coins. She noted that while the question of whether Barnum should appear on the coin was not in the jurisdiction of the commission, that had not stopped it from weighing in against the appearance of Stephen Foster on the Cincinnati Musical Center half dollar.

On June 24, 1936, the commission chair, Charles Moore, wrote to Ross, enclosing comments from Lee Lawrie, sculptor-member of the commission, generally approving of Kreis's designs, but proposing that the words LIBERTY and IN GOD WE TRUST be moved from below Barnum's head on the obverse to the reverse. This, Lawrie suggested, would allow space for the name CONNECTICUT (abbreviated as CONN. on the original) to be rendered in full. Revised models were approved by the commission, and on August 4, the completed models for the coins were sent to Morgenthau by Assistant Director of the Mint Mary M. O'Reilly. The models were converted to coin-sized hubs by the Medallic Art Company of New York in time for coinage to begin in September.

== Design ==
The obverse of the Bridgeport half dollar depicts the bust of P. T. Barnum, a subject that has absorbed much of the commentary on the coin's design. Michael K. Garofalo, in his article on Kreis, stated, "although the portrait bears a very strong likeness to Barnum, the rendering was merely average for the talented Kreis." Anthony Swiatek and Walter Breen, in their volume on commemoratives, aver that "the choice of P. T. Barnum, of all imaginable people ... has less to do with his 'There's a sucker born every minute' cynicism (however applicable this might have been to commemorative coin fanciers in the 1930s) than to his philanthropic benefactions to the city." Breen called Barnum the patron saint of coin collectors. Dealer B. Max Mehl, in his 1937 work on commemoratives, suggested purchasers of the coin were "suckers", and wrote, "we think that Barnum's likeness, in view of his famous remark, is certainly most appropriate".

Mehl also criticized the reverse of the coin:

The eagle (?) on the new Bridgeport half dollar is the biggest joke as a specimen of our noble bird that ever appeared on a coin. Not a feather appears on its tin-roof surface, and several beholders said it resembled an airplane. Turn it around and you have a fine shark with two dorsal fins, an open mouth and a tongue. The shark appears to be laughing. I wonder at whom? And how apropos that P. T. Barnum's portrait adorns the other side. He was right in his famous remarks years ago.

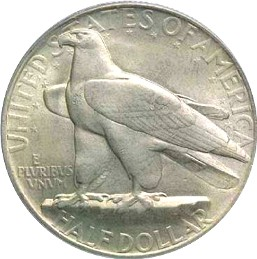
Kreis's eagle for the Connecticut Tercentenary half dollar

Q. David Bowers describes Kreis's eagle as modernistic and noted its resemblance to the one the sculptor had created for the Connecticut half dollar. Don Taxay, writing in 1966, concurred, considering the eagle the most modernistic seen on any coin. Coin writer Kevin Flynn called it an "ultra modern eagle". Garofalo stated, "Kreis' highly stylized eagle met with mixed reviews. Critically acclaimed by the art world, it bewildered the public, many of whom did not readily identify the bird as the nation's symbol." Kreis's initial K is found incuse in the lower right.

Swiatek and Breen deemed the coin a "very Art Deco composition". According to Garofalo, "From an artistic standpoint, Kreis' designs for the Bridgeport half dollar were an amazing success. The obverse was conservative and accurate, as a portrait should be, and the reverse was stylish and inspirational." Art historian Cornelius Vermeule, in his volume on U.S. coins and medals, stated that the Bridgeport piece "has been cited as one of the more successful commemorative coins within the broad tradition instituted by Augustus Saint-Gaudens". He described the piece as having "P. T. Barnum in large, thoughtful profile and a thrusting eagle of conceptual, metallic style", and praised the lettering, finding the placement of the patriotic mottos on the reverse done "not inartistically". Vermeule suggested that Kreis was unable to find a suitable Bridgeport-related theme for the reverse, and instead turned "to a new interpretation of elements, such as the eagle, used in the coins of the regular issue. A coin honoring P. T. Barnum could have featured a lion, an elephant, or a performing bear on the reverse, but this product of the civic enterprise of Bridgeport gains great merit for showing an exciting new form of the national bird".

== Production, distribution and collecting ==
In September 1936, a total of 25,015 Bridgeport half dollars were struck at the Philadelphia Mint with 15 pieces reserved for inspection and testing the following year by the annual Assay Commission. They were sold at a price of $2, mostly through local banks in Bridgeport. Mail order sales were processed by the First National Bank of Bridgeport. By this time, many of the centennial celebrations had passed, having begun June 4, though they continued until October 3. Individual coins were sold in small cardboard boxes, with a limit of five per purchaser. Despite its relatively high price and the fact that it was released after many of the centennial celebrations, the coin sold well with both the public and collectors.

Several thousand pieces remained unsold, and transferred by the centennial organizers to the Bridgeport Community Chest, which sold them wholesale to coin dealers at a slight advance on face value. In the 1950s, Toivo Johnson, a coin dealer in Maine, possessed about a thousand of them, and rolls of 20 were sold at coin conventions for years after; many were acquired and then sold by a coin investment firm in the early 1970s.

By 1940 the Bridgeport piece sold for about $1.50 in uncirculated condition, though this went up to $2.50 by 1950, $12 by 1960, and $250 by 1985. The deluxe edition of R. S. Yeoman's A Guide Book of United States Coins, published in 2018, lists the coin for between $120 and $300, depending on condition. An exceptional specimen sold for $1,880 in 2015.

== Sources ==
- Bowers, Q. David (1992). Commemorative Coins of the United States: A Complete Encyclopedia. Wolfeboro, NH: Bowers and Merena Galleries, Inc. ISBN 978-0-943161-35-8.
- Flynn, Kevin (2008). The Authoritative Reference on Commemorative Coins 1892–1954. Roswell, GA: Kyle Vick. OCLC 711779330.
- Garofalo, Michael K. (November 2006). "Henry G. Kreis: An epitaph in stone, bronze & silver". The Numismatist: 40–46.
- Mehl, B. Max (1937). The Commemorative Coinage of the United States. Fort Worth, TX: B. Max Mehl. OCLC 2872685.
- Slabaugh, Arlie R. (1975). United States Commemorative Coinage (second ed.). Racine, WI: Whitman Publishing. ISBN 978-0-307-09377-6.
- Swiatek, Anthony & Breen, Walter (1981). The Encyclopedia of United States Silver & Gold Commemorative Coins, 1892 to 1954. New York, NY: Arco Publishing. ISBN 978-0-668-04765-4.
- Taxay, Don (1967). An Illustrated History of U.S. Commemorative Coinage. New York, NY: Arco Publishing. ISBN 978-0-668-01536-3.
- United States Senate Committee on Banking and Currency (March 11, 1936). Coinage of commemorative 50-cent pieces. United States Government Printing Office.
- Vermeule, Cornelius (1971). Numismatic Art in America. Cambridge, MA: The Belknap Press of Harvard University Press. ISBN 978-0-674-62840-3.
- Yeoman, R. S. (2018). A Guide Book of United States Coins (Mega Red 4th ed.). Atlanta, GA: Whitman Publishing, LLC. ISBN 978-0-7948-4580-3.
