= Long Island Tercentenary half dollar =

Commemorative half dollar in 1936

- United States
- Value: 50 cents (0.50 US dollars)
- Mass: 12.5 g
- Diameter: 30.61 mm (1.20 in)
- Thickness: 2.15 mm (0.08 in)
- Edge: Reeded
- Composition: 90.0% silver; 10.0% copper
- Silver: 0.36169 troy oz
- Years of minting: 1936
- Mintage: 100,053, including 53 pieces designated for the Assay Commission; 18,227 melted
- Mint marks: None, all pieces struck at Philadelphia Mint without mint mark.

Obverse
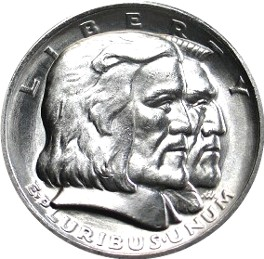
- Design: Native American and Dutch settler
- Designer: Howard Kenneth Weinman
- Design date: 1936

Reverse
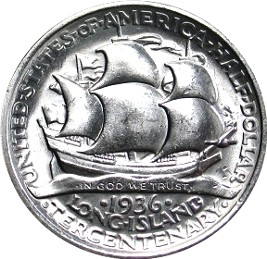
- Design: Dutch sailing vessel
- Designer: Howard Kenneth Weinman
- Design date: 1936

The Long Island Tercentenary half dollar was a commemorative half dollar struck by the United States Bureau of the Mint in 1936. The obverse depicts a male Dutch settler and an Algonquian tribesman, and the reverse shows a Dutch sailing ship. It was designed by Howard Weinman, the son of Mercury dime designer Adolph A. Weinman.

The Long Island Tercentenary Committee wanted a coin to mark the 300th anniversary of the first European settlement there, at modern Flatlands, Brooklyn, New York City. The authorizing bill passed through Congress without opposition. Still, it was amended in the Senate to add protections against past commemorative coin abuses, such as low mintages or an assortment of varieties. On April 13, 1936, the bill became law with the signature of President Franklin D. Roosevelt.

The coins were not struck until August of that year, too late for the anniversary celebrations, which had been held in May. The coins were placed on sale to the public, and four-fifths of the 100,000 coins sent to the Tercentenary Committee were sold, a result deemed to be successful given the significant issue and a lack of advertising. The remainder was sent back to the Philadelphia Mint for redemption and melting. The half dollar catalogs up to the low hundreds of dollars.

== Background and inception ==
The first European known to have sighted Long Island, now part of New York State, was Henry Hudson in 1609. At the time of what was later deemed its discovery, 13 tribes of Native Americans inhabited the island. The first European settlement, on Jamaica Bay, was by the Dutch. The first deed for land on Long Island was dated June 16, 1636, for land conveyed to two Dutch colonists, Andries Hudde and Wolphert Gerretse. The transfer was facilitated by the Canarsee Sachem Penhawitz, and under Hudde and Gerretse the land became the Achtervelt farm and then the Town of New Amersfoort, and later modern Flatlands, Brooklyn. The Dutch called the island as a whole Lange Eylandt; after the British took possession of the area in the 1660s, they attempted to rename it Nassau, but this never became popularly used until the establishment of Nassau County in 1899.

In 1936, commemorative coins were not sold by the government—Congress, in authorizing legislation, usually designated an organization that had the exclusive right to purchase them at face value and tend them to the public at a premium. In the case of the Long Island half dollar, the responsible group was the Long Island Tercentenary Committee, acting through either its president or its secretary. That committee was formed to organize the anniversary celebrations to take place on Long Island.

== Legislation ==
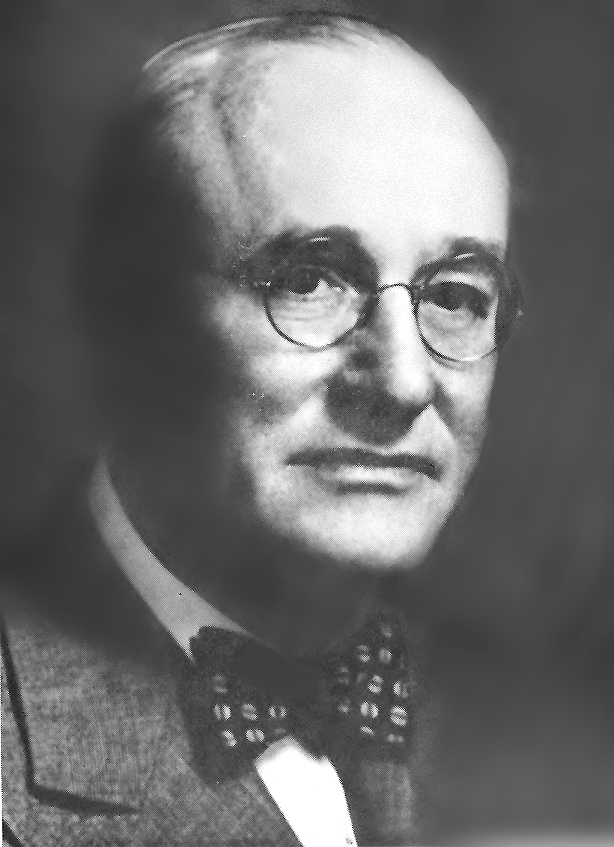
Congressman John J. Delaney

The political influence of the members of the Tercentenary Committee was sufficient to get a bill into Congress. Introduced into the House of Representatives by John J. Delaney of New York on February 20, 1936, the bill called for a minimum of 100,000 half dollars to be struck (no maximum was stated). The bill was referred to the Committee on Coinage, Weights, and Measures. That committee reported back on February 28, 1936, through Andrew Somers of New York, recommending passage. Somers was the committee chair; both he and Delaney represented Brooklyn. John J. Cochran of Missouri brought the bill to the House floor on March 6, saying he was doing so on behalf of Somers and Delaney, and on his motion the bill passed without debate or opposition.

In the Senate, the bill was referred to the Committee on Banking and Currency; it was one of several commemorative coin bills to be considered on March 11, 1936, by a subcommittee led by Colorado's Alva B. Adams. Senator Adams had heard of the commemorative coin abuses of the mid-1930s, with issuers increasing the number of coins needed for a complete set by having them issued at different mints with different mint marks; authorizing legislation placed no prohibition on this. Lyman W. Hoffecker, a Texas coin dealer and official of the American Numismatic Association, testified and told the subcommittee that some issues, like the Oregon Trail Memorial half dollar, first struck in 1926, had been issued over the course of years with different dates and mint marks. Other issues had been entirely bought up by single dealers, and some low-mintage varieties of commemorative coins were selling at high prices. The many varieties and inflated prices for some issues that resulted from these practices angered coin collectors trying to keep their collections current.

On March 26, the committee, through Senator Adams, issued a report recommending the bill pass once amended. That amendment required that the coins be struck at only one mint, that they only be issued for a year and bear the date of authorization (1936) regardless of when coined. A minimum of 5,000 and a maximum of 100,000 were to be issued. Adams recommended that these provisions appear in future commemorative coin bills. The Senate considered the bill on March 27, the last in a series of six commemorative coin bills being considered by that body, and like the others, the Long Island bill was amended and passed without debate or dissent.

As the two houses had passed different versions, the bill returned to the House of Representatives, where, on March 30, Cochran asked that the House agree to the Senate amendment. Bertrand H. Snell of New York requested an explanation of the Senate amendment; he was told by Cochran that it was a strengthening of the language to ensure there was no expense to the federal government. The House agreed to the amendment and passed the bill without dissent. It was passed into law, authorizing 100,000 half dollars, with the signature of President Franklin D. Roosevelt on April 13, 1936. The provision that the coins only be struck at a single mint and the one requiring that all coins bear the same date were firsts for commemorative coin legislation.

== Preparation ==
At the recommendation of the federal Commission of Fine Arts (CFA), the Tercentenary Committee engaged sculptor Howard Kenneth Weinman, the son of sculptor Adolph Alexander Weinman. The CFA was responsible for making recommendations on the artistic merit of public artworks, including coins. The elder Weinman was known for designing the Mercury dime and Walking Liberty half dollar and wrote to CFA secretary H.R. Caemmerer on April 2, 1936, relating that Howard Weinman had been hired, and asking for details of the procedure for commemorative coin approval. Caemmerer replied the following day, stating that the designs should be sent to the Philadelphia Mint once the authorization bill had been given final approval.

On April 19, Howard Weinman wrote to Caemmerer, stating that due to the Tercentenary Committee having gotten off to a late start, only preliminary sketches had been made, and asking at what stage the designs needed to be submitted for approval. Caemmerer replied on the 21st, stating that for purposes of CFA approval, it would be best to send copies of the photographs of the completed plaster model to himself, and to Lee Lawrie, sculptor-member of the CFA. Caemmerer also suggested that Howard Weinman consult his father as to the procedure for submission to the Mint, as Adolph Weinman had done it many times. By May, Howard Weinman had completed his models. Lawrie had a few minor suggestions, but was greatly pleased with the work. The CFA concurred on the 26th, having some additional suggestions, such as placing HALF DOLLAR under the ship on the reverse (something not adopted).

After the CFA granted preliminary approval, Adolph Weinman met with the Director of the Mint, Nellie Tayloe Ross, and with the Assistant Director, Mary Margaret O'Reilly, to come to terms on the recommended changes. For example, to ensure greater clarity, the legend IN GOD WE TRUST, appearing incuse, graven into the surface beneath the ship, was to be engraved on the master die directly by John R. Sinnock, the Chief Engraver. When Howard Weinman wrote to Caemmerer on June 22, he stated that he was working in haste, so that the coins would be available as quickly as possible. The Commission gave its approval; Howard Weinman's models were reduced to coin-sized hubs by the Medallic Art Company of New York City.

== Design ==
Other ships on classic US commemorative coins

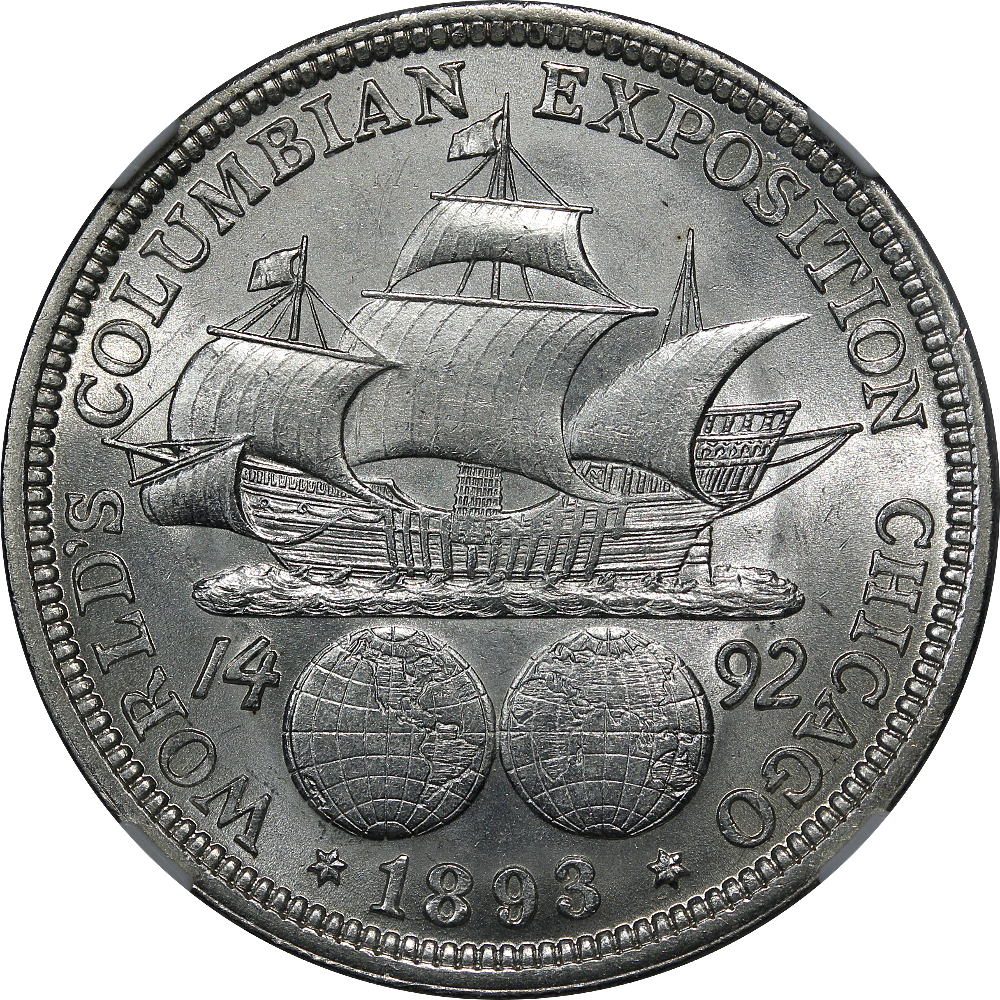
Santa María, Columbian half dollar (1892)

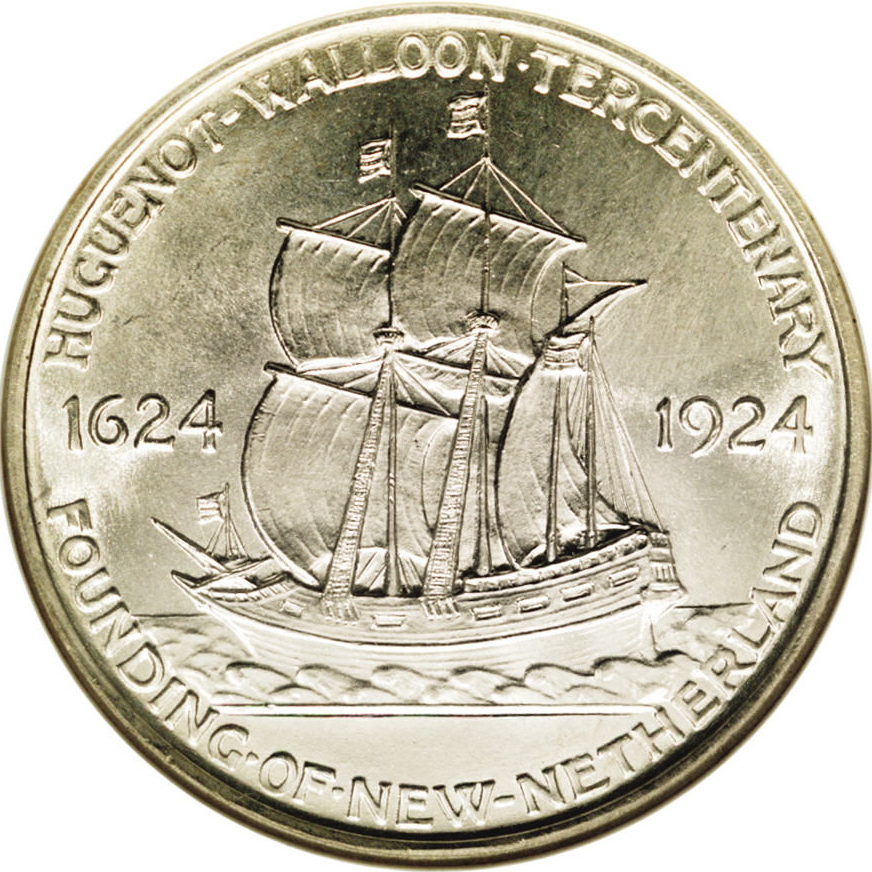
Nieuw Nederlandt, Huguenot-Walloon half dollar (1924)

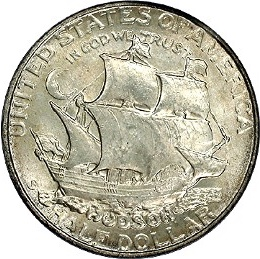
Halve Maen, Hudson Sesquicentennial half dollar (1935)

The obverse of the half dollar depicts jugate busts of a Dutch settler and a member of the Algonquin tribe of Native Americans. Howard Weinman wrote of this, "I shall try to infer by the harmonious balance of the heads the peaceful settlement of the island by the Dutch". Texas coin dealer B. Max Mehl described the obverse in 1937 as "conjoined portraits of two rather tough looking gentlemen, but so far I have been unable to ascertain just who they are or who they are supposed to represent". Other critics have compared the two heads, with their lantern jaws and prominent noses, to two boxers about to square off. Also present on the obverse are some of the inscriptions required by law, LIBERTY and E PLURIBUS UNUM.

The reverse depicts a Dutch three-masted ship sailing to the right. The design resembles the depiction of Henry Hudson's ship Halve Maen on the 1935 Hudson Sesquicentennial half dollar but is more stylized. In the waves the ship rides over is the text, IN GOD WE TRUST, with the name of the country and the denomination of the coin surrounding the scene, together with the legend, LONG ISLAND TERCENTENARY.

David Bullowa, in his 1938 volume on commemorative coins, noted that the designs had generally been criticized as a number of previous commemoratives had borne busts in a similar matter to the Long Island piece, and others had depicted ships. Art historian Cornelius Vermeule, in his volume on American coins and medals, took a mixed view of the Long Island half dollar, "The Dutch pioneer looks like a character out of Shakespeare (a peasant part), and the Indian could easily play professional football any Sunday afternoon across the United States. Otherwise, beyond those cliches brought about in an effort to modernize traditionally ideal subjects, the ship has a correct amount of simplicity, and the lettering seems to fade into the background in a satisfying fashion."

== Distribution ==
A total of 100,053 Long Island Tercentenary half dollars were struck at the Philadelphia Mint during August 1936, with 53 pieces to be retained at the mint to be available for inspection and testing at the 1937 meeting of the annual Assay Commission. The issuance of the half dollar made the Weinmans the second parent and child to have both designed U.S. coins, the first having been Chief Engravers William Barber (1869–1879) and Charles Barber (1880–1917) of the U.S. Mint. Advance sales accounted for almost 19,000 coins. By the time of issue, the celebrations on Long Island had passed, having been held under the auspices of the Tercentenary Committee in May. Arlie Slabaugh wrote in his book on commemoratives, "Even so the Long Island Tercentenary Committee did a surprisingly good job of selling these through local banks". After the coins were delivered from the mint to the National City Bank in Brooklyn, they were sold to the public at various places for $1 each. The office of the Brooklyn Eagle made 50,000 coins available. In addition, 25,000 coins were offered for sale in Queens, 15,000 in Nassau County and 10,000 in Suffolk County. They were for sale at Brooklyn department stores. Despite arriving late, the coins sold relatively well, with 81,826 coins out of 100,000 disposed of despite almost no advertising.

In August 1936, examples of the new half dollar were presented by the Tercentenary Commission to President Roosevelt. Sales continued through the first few months of 1937. As was the norm with other early commemoratives, the remaining unsold coins were returned to the mint for melting. Unlike other commemorative coins of the 1930s, there were no complaints about the manner of distribution, as anyone who wanted one could buy one; nor was there any profiteering. The coin was purchased both by the coin collecting community and by residents of Long Island.

== Collecting ==
As the coins sold well, the Long Island Tercentenary half dollar is often considered one of the more common early commemoratives. However, few coins survive in gem condition. Problems commonly encountered include wear or bag marks (abrasions) on the high points of the coin, such as on the cheek of the Dutch settler on the obverse and the sails of the ship on the reverse. One reason for this is that the coin design, especially on the reverse, is relatively flat, thus making it prone to bag marks. Other pieces were handled carelessly while in the hands of the public. Marty Rubenstein, a local coin dealer, stated, "Long Islands don't generally come nice."

The Long Island Tercentenary half dollar sold at retail for about $1.25 in uncirculated condition in 1940. It thereafter increased in value, selling for about $4 by 1955, and $140 by 1985. The deluxe edition of R. S. Yeoman's A Guide Book of United States Coins, published in 2018, lists the coin for between $85 and $450, depending on condition. An exceptional specimen sold for $9,988 in 2015. Harry Miller, a Patchogue, Long Island, coin dealer, stated in 2002, "I find most collectors on Long Island want to have one even if they don't specialize in commemoratives".

== Sources ==
- Bowers, Q. David (1992). Commemorative Coins of the United States: A Complete Encyclopedia. Wolfeboro, NH: Bowers and Merena Galleries, Inc. ISBN 978-0-943161-35-8.
- Bullowa, David M. (1938). "The Commemorative Coinage of the United States 1892–1938". Numismatic Notes and Monographs (83). New York: American Numismatic Society: i–192. JSTOR 43607181.(subscription required)
- Flynn, Kevin (2008). The Authoritative Reference on Commemorative Coins 1892–1954. Roswell, GA: Kyle Vick. OCLC 711779330.
- Slabaugh, Arlie R. (1975). United States Commemorative Coinage (second ed.). Racine, WI: Whitman Publishing. ISBN 978-0-307-09377-6.
- Swiatek, Anthony (2012). Encyclopedia of the Commemorative Coins of the United States. Chicago, IL: KWS Publishers. ISBN 978-0-9817736-7-4.
- Swiatek, Anthony; Breen, Walter (1981). The Encyclopedia of United States Silver & Gold Commemorative Coins, 1892 to 1954. New York, NY: Arco Publishing. ISBN 978-0-668-04765-4.
- Taxay, Don (1967). An Illustrated History of U.S. Commemorative Coinage. New York, NY: Arco Publishing. ISBN 978-0-668-01536-3.
- United States Senate Committee on Banking and Currency (March 11, 1936). Coinage of commemorative 50-cent pieces. United States Government Printing Office.
- Vermeule, Cornelius (1971). Numismatic Art in America. Cambridge, MA: The Belknap Press of Harvard University Press. ISBN 978-0-674-62840-3.
- Yeoman, R. S. (2018). A Guide Book of United States Coins 2014 (Mega Red 4th ed.). Atlanta, GA: Whitman Publishing, LLC. ISBN 978-0-7948-4580-3.
