= Battle of Antietam half dollar =

Commemorative coin

- United States
- Value: 50 cents (0.50 US dollars)
- Mass: 12.5 g
- Diameter: 30.61 mm (1.20 in)
- Thickness: 2.15 mm (0.08 in)
- Edge: Reeded
- Composition: 90.0% silver; 10.0% copper
- Silver: 0.36169 troy oz
- Years of minting: 1937
- Mintage: 50,000 (32,000 melted)
- Mint marks: None, all pieces struck at Philadelphia Mint without mint mark.

Obverse
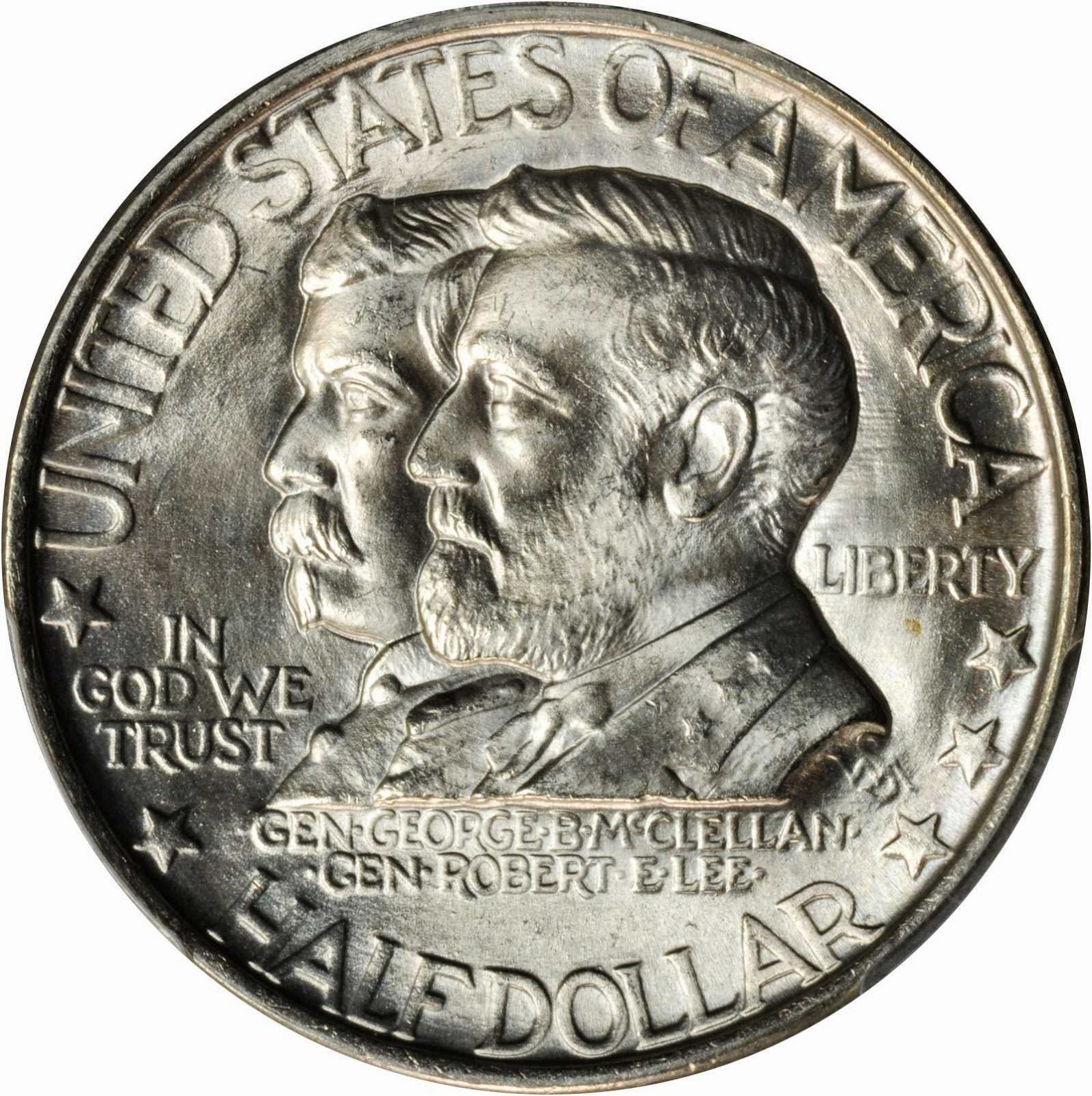
- Design: Robert E. Lee and George McClellan
- Designer: William Marks Simpson
- Design date: 1937

Reverse
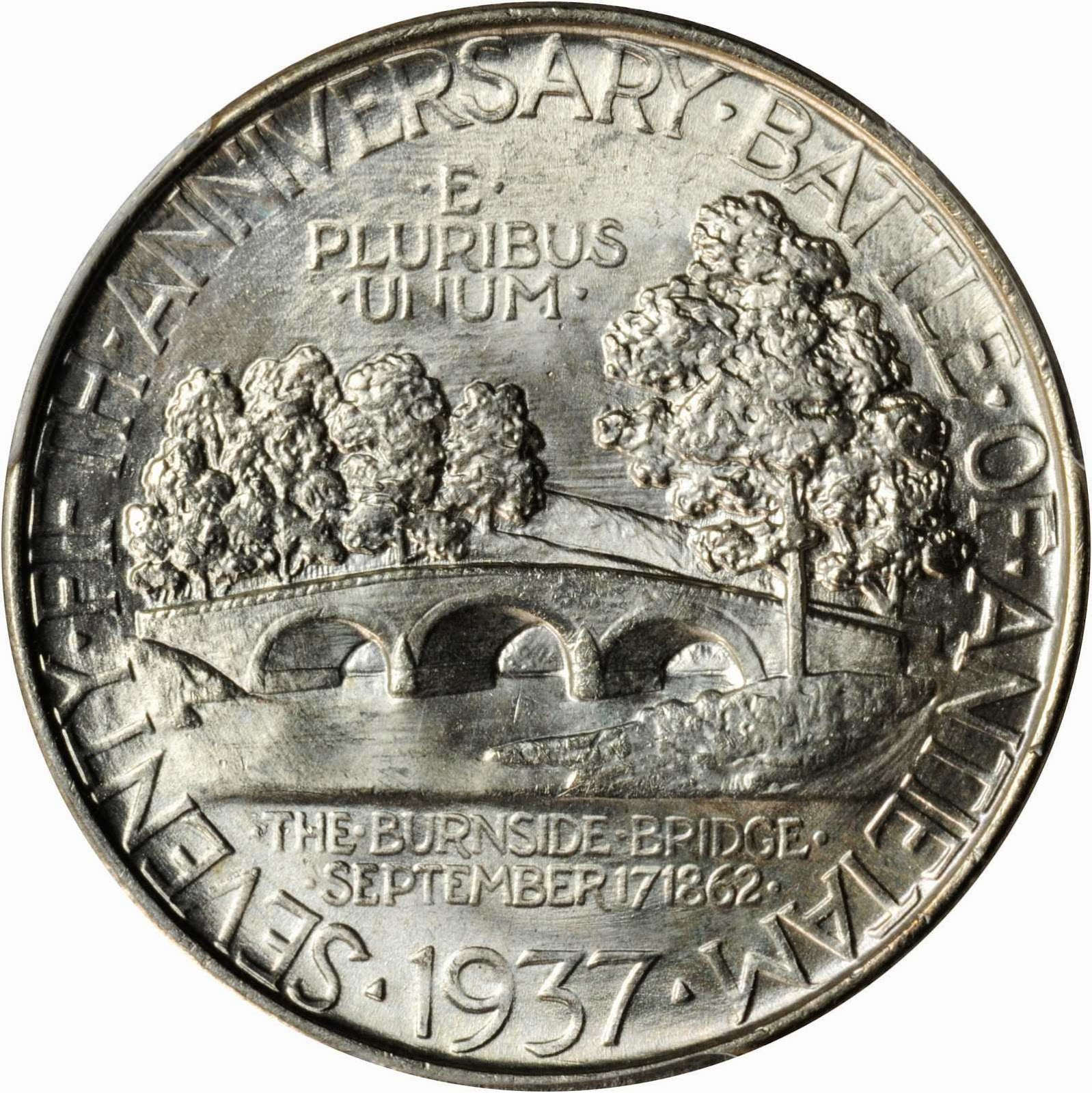
- Design: Burnside's Bridge
- Designer: William Marks Simpson
- Design date: 1937

The Battle of Antietam half dollar was designed by William M. Simpson and minted in 1937 to commemorate the 75th anniversary of the Battle of Antietam. The obverse depicts Robert E. Lee and George McClellan, and the reverse shows Burnside's Bridge.

== Inception ==
Similar to the Delaware Tercentenary half dollar, the reason for minting the commemorative was by the historical significance of the coin's subject rather than for profit as was the case with many contemporary commemorative coins. Both Washington County Historical Society of Hagerstown, Maryland, as well as the Antietam Celebration Commission had called for the minting of a commemorative coin to mark 75th anniversary of the Battle of Antietam. The bill authorizing the minting of the coin passed on June 24 and set a minimum of 50,000 coins to be minted. Additionally, taking into consideration the abuses perpetrated by previous commemorative coin programs, this legislation specifically required for the coins to be struck with a single design and at a single mint.

== Preparation ==
Sculptor William Marks Simpson was hired to design the coin. Simpson, who had previously designed two other commemorative coins, (the Norfolk, Virginia, Bicentennial half dollar and the Roanoke Island, North Carolina half dollar), completed his designs and models in April 1937; the Commission of Fine Arts approved them the same day. Despite pressure to have the coins shipped by the celebration on August 1, 1937, the first specimens shipped more than a week later.

The first specimen was presented to President Franklin D. Roosevelt on August 12, 1937.

== Release and collecting ==
The minimum authorized mintage of 50,000 coins was struck and were sent to the Washington County Historical Society, which sold the coins for $1.65 apiece. The authorizing Washington County Historical Society wished to avoid the speculation (rapid buying up of coins for quick re-selling at a profit) that had plagued other commemorative issues and wished to get the coins directly into the hands of collectors as easily as possible.

However, due to scandals associated with commemorative coins from the previous year, collectors had begun to grow tired of commemorative issues. As a result, despite substantial advertising efforts, the coin was a poor seller; 18,000 coins were sold and the remaining 32,000 halves were returned to the Philadelphia Mint for melting. However, despite selling poorly, the commemorative program was entirely free of scandal. Few saw any circulation, and no proofs are known to exist.

This is the only 1937-dated commemorative coin which was authorized, produced and issued during that year; (the Roanoke half dollars were authorized in 1936).
