= William Marks Simpson =

American sculptor and teacher

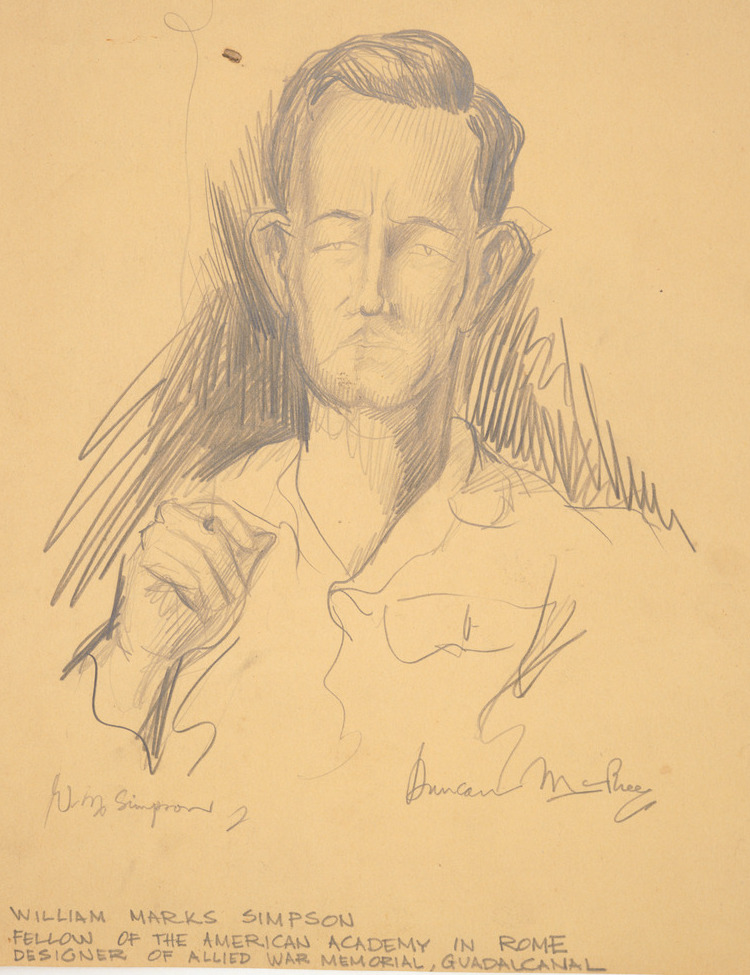
Pencil sketch of Simpson by Duncan McPhee, 1943–44

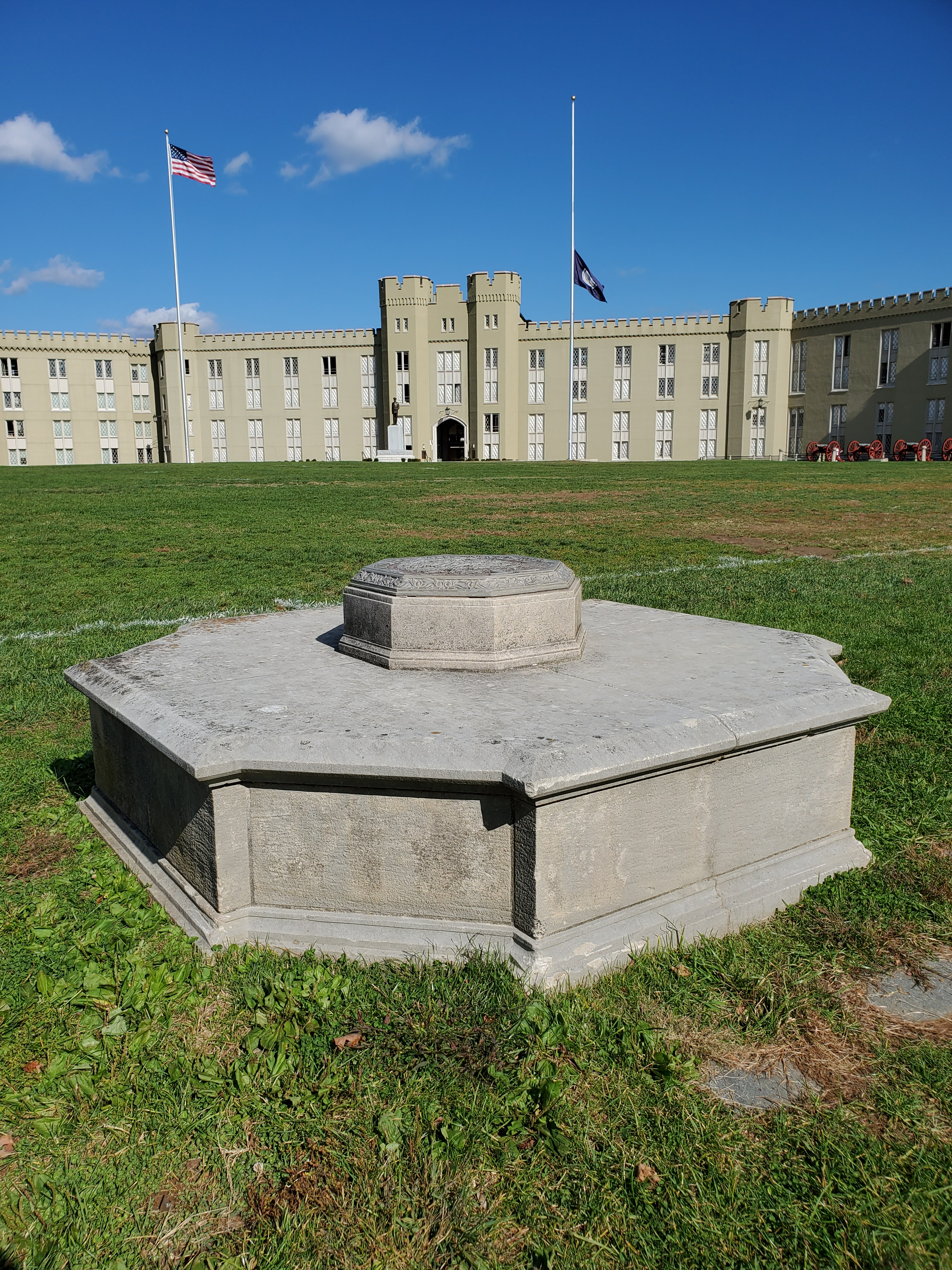
The Guard Tree Memorial on the Parade Ground of the Virginia Military Institute, designed by William Marks Simpson, VMI Class of 1924.

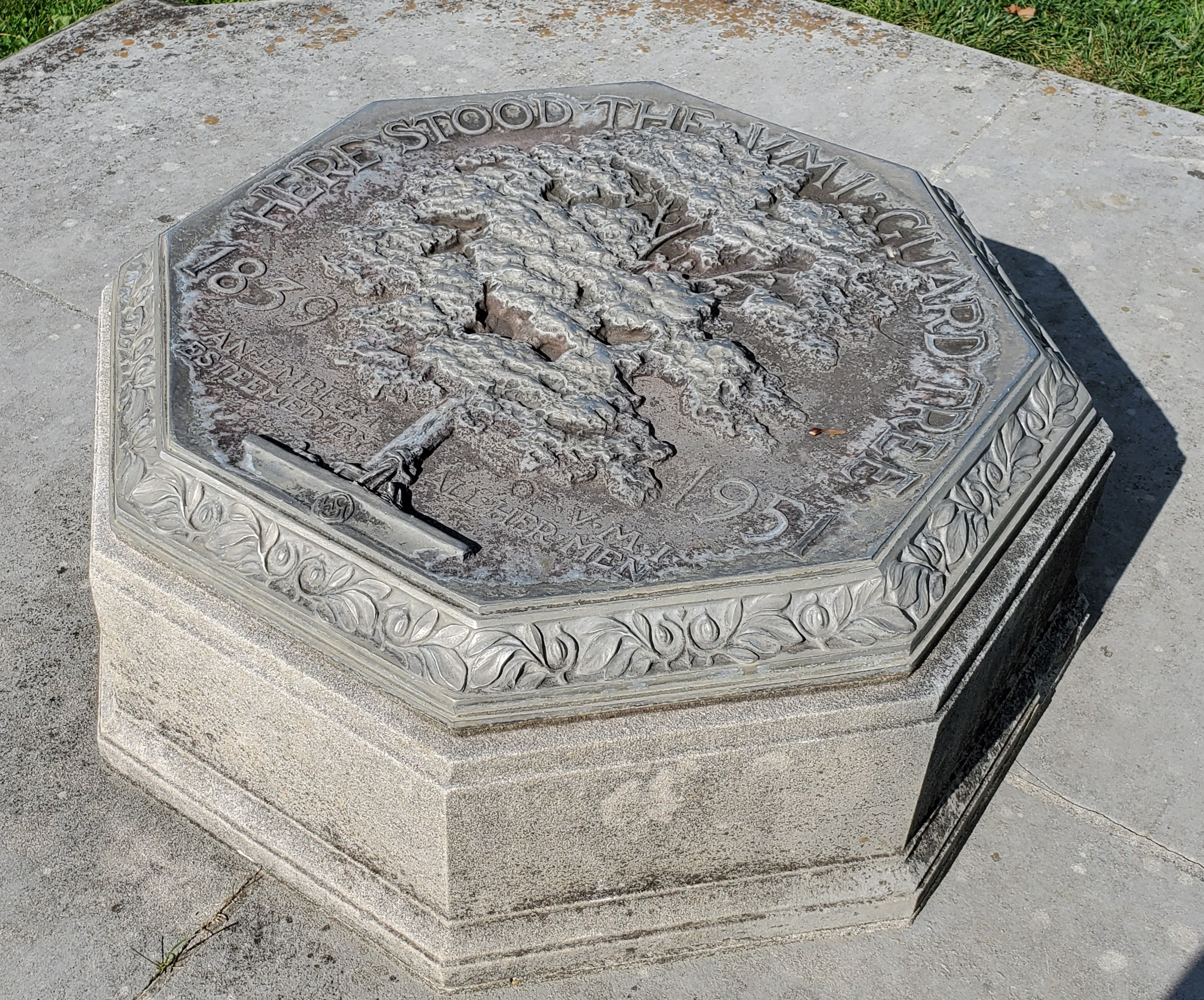
Guard Tree Medallion on the Guard Tree Memorial, designed by William Marks Simpson, VMI Class of 1924.

William Marks Simpson (August 24, 1903-October 22, 1958) was an American sculptor and teacher. He was hired by the United States Bureau of the Mint to design some of the commemorative coins including the Battle of Antietam half dollar, Roanoke Island, North Carolina, half dollar and Norfolk, Virginia, Bicentennial half dollar. He also designed the Allied war memorial Guadalcanal.

== Biography ==
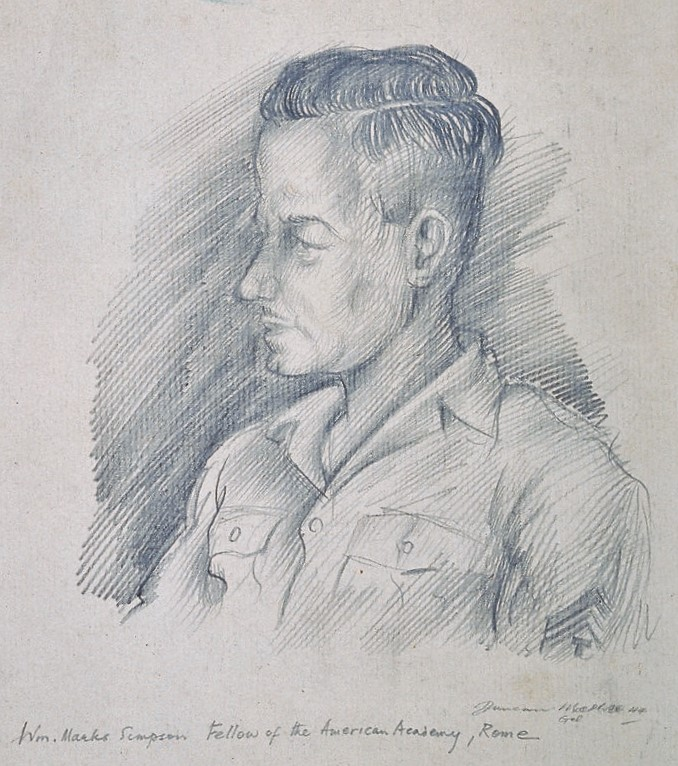
Pencil sketch of Simpson in 1944

William Marks Simpson was born in 1903 in Norfolk, Virginia, United States. He earned his Bachelor of Arts from the Virginia Military Institute in 1924. He graduated from the Rinehart School of Sculpture, Maryland Institute of Art, where he later became its director. He was also a Fellow of the American Academy in Rome.

He married Marjorie Emory Simpson, a graduate of the Rinehart School of Sculpture, with her, in 1936, he designed the Norfolk, Virginia, Bicentennial half dollar.

In 1930 he was a recipient of the Prix de Rome.

During World War II Simpson volunteered for service and served with the Army in the Pacific from 1942 until 1946. While in the service he designed two decorative grille-works for the entrance at the Army headquarters building at Honolulu and at Guadalcanal American Memorial. He was awarded the Army Commendation Medal for his designs.

He taught at the Virginia Military Institute from 1953-1956.

William Marks Simpson died on October 22, 1958.
