= Roanoke Island, North Carolina, half dollar =

United States commemorative coin

- United States
- Value: 50 cents (0.50 US dollars)
- Mass: 12.5 g
- Diameter: 30.61 mm (1.20 in)
- Thickness: 2.15 mm (0.08 in)
- Edge: Reeded
- Composition: 90.0% silver; 10.0% copper
- Silver: 0.36169 troy oz
- Years of minting: 1937
- Mintage: 50,030 (including 30 pieces reserved for the Assay Commission)
- Mint marks: None. All pieces struck at the Philadelphia Mint without mint marks.

Obverse
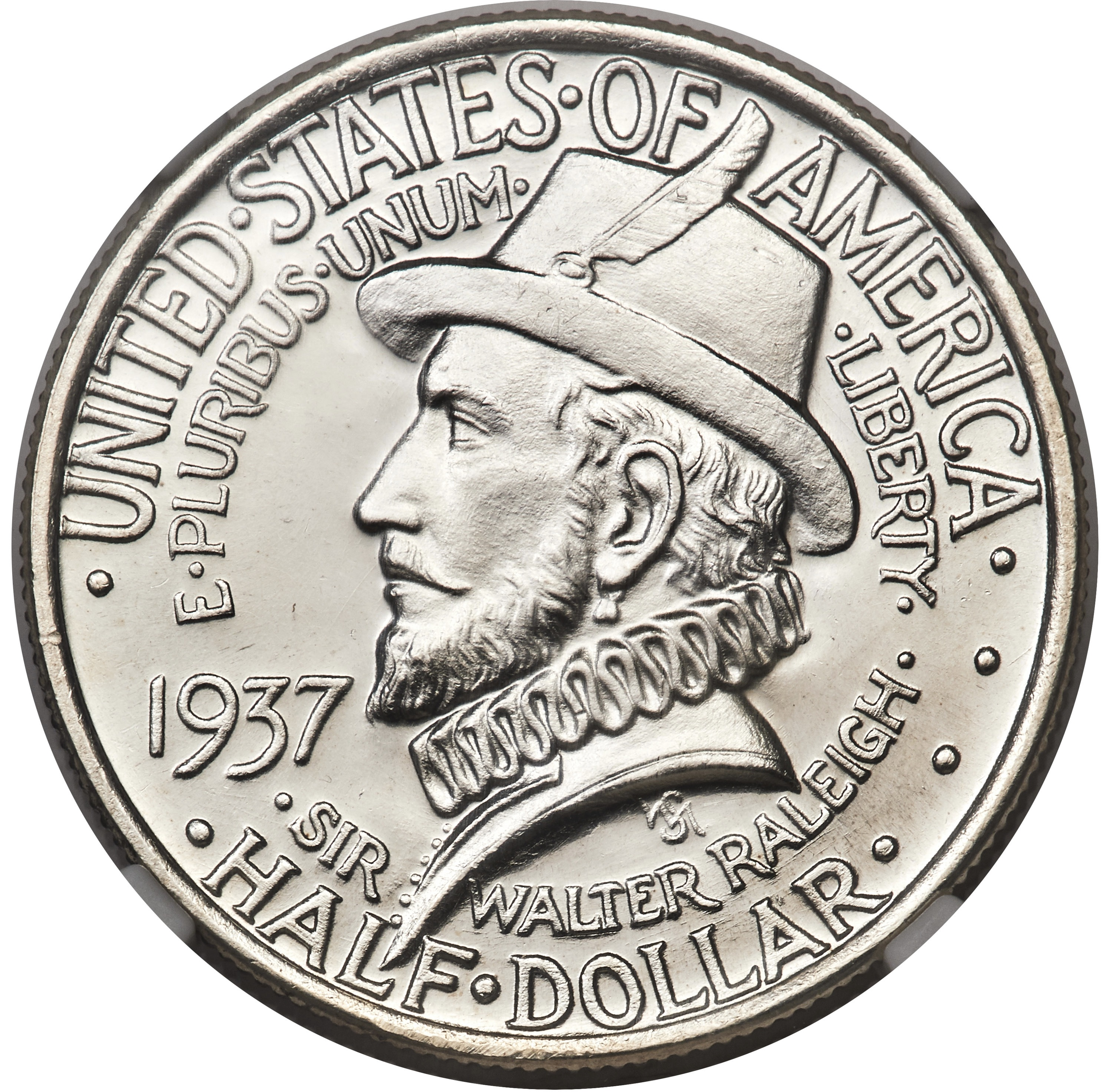
- Design: Walter Raleigh
- Designer: William Marks Simpson
- Design date: 1937

Reverse
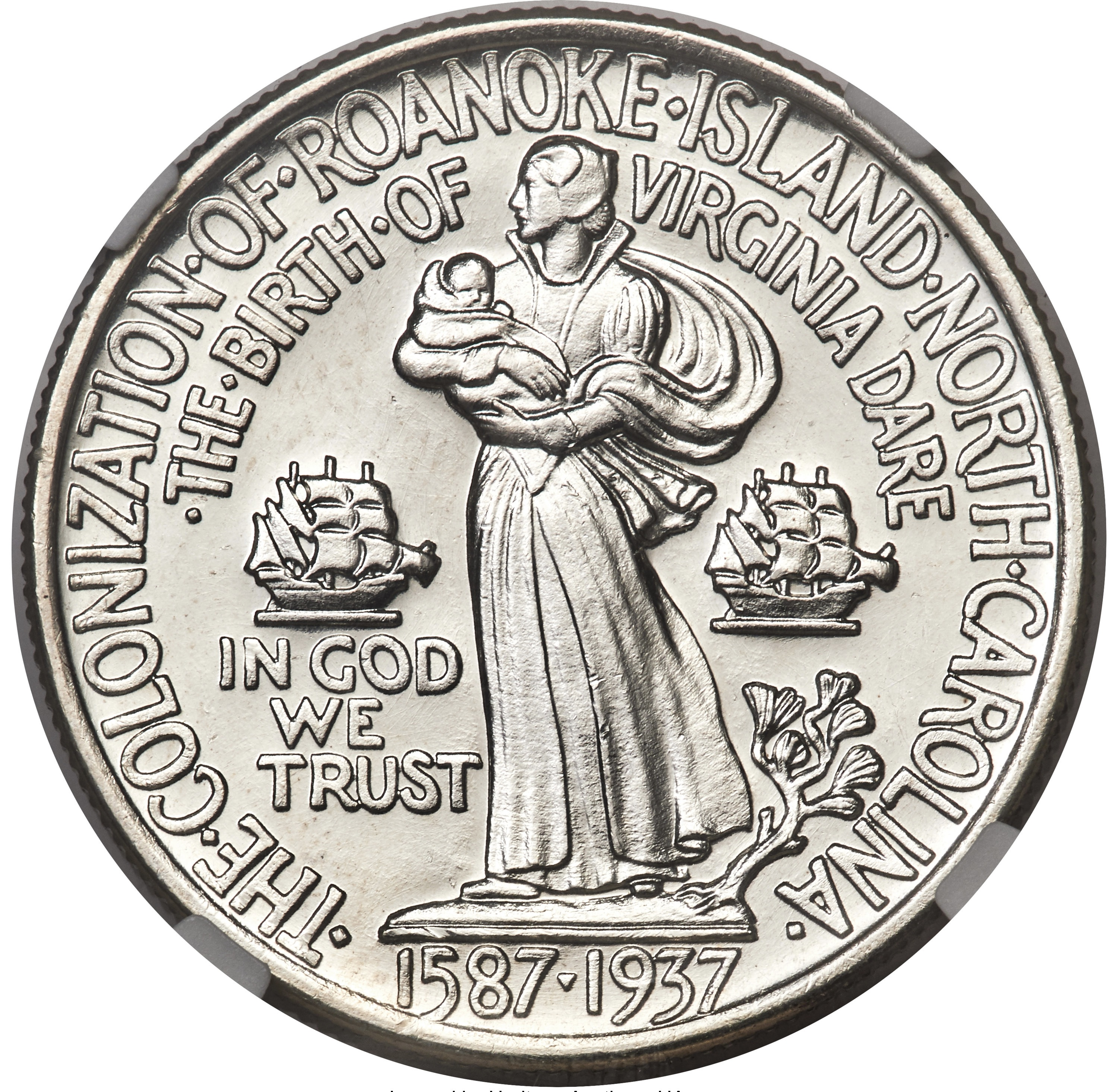
- Design: Eleanor Dare holding her child, Virginia Dare
- Designer: William Marks Simpson
- Design date: 1937

The Roanoke Island, North Carolina, half dollar (also Roanoke Island half dollar) is a commemorative coin issued by the United States Bureau of the Mint in 1937. The coin commemorated the 350th anniversary of the Roanoke Colony, depicting Sir Walter Raleigh on one side, and on the other Eleanor Dare, holding her child, Virginia Dare, the first child of English descent born in an English colony in the Americas.

The Roanoke Island half dollar was one of many commemorative issues authorized by Congress in 1936. Since it was intended to commemorate the 350th anniversary of the colony, founded in 1587, the coins were not struck until 1937. William Marks Simpson, a sculptor who created several commemorative coins of the era, designed the Roanoke Island issue. His work required only slight modification at the recommendation of the Commission of Fine Arts.

The legislation allowed the Roanoke Memorial Association to buy at least 25,000 at a time, so long as the issue took place before July 1937, and the group placed two orders for the minimum amount. Eventually, 21,000 were returned to the Mint for redemption and melting. The Roanoke Island issue catalogs in the low hundreds of dollars.

== Background and inception ==
In 1584, Sir Walter Raleigh was given letters patent by Queen Elizabeth I of England authorizing him to explore "remote heathen and barbarous lands". He outfitted two ships for an expedition to America, hoping to found a settlement as close to Spanish Florida as possible. The ships explored along the Atlantic coast and Roanoke Island, in what is today North Carolina, was chosen as a site for settlement because there were friendly Native Americans nearby. In 1585, Raleigh sent seven more ships to Roanoke Island; Queen Elizabeth named the region "Virginia". In 1586, low on supplies, the colonists returned to England after Sir Francis Drake visited and took them on board his ships.

A resupply expedition arrived only weeks after the colonists departed, and left 15 individuals, but they perished by 1587. Raleigh sold his rights, and the purchasers sent three ships with colonists, who were left at Roanoke Island in 1587 under John White. On August 18, 1587, White's daughter Eleanor Dare gave birth to a daughter, Virginia Dare, the first English child born in a New World English colony. Nine days later, White left for England to arrange for resupply. His attempts there were frustrated by war with Spain, as England needed every ship to defend against the Spanish Armada. It was not until 1590 that White returned, to find the colonists gone, leaving the word CROATOAN carved into a tree. Their fate remains unknown, although there has been much speculation that they perished on the island or at sea, or were assimilated into a nearby Native American tribe.

Sparked by new issues with low mintages for which the demand was greater than the supply, the market for United States commemorative coins spiked in 1936. Until 1954, the entire mintage of such issues was sold by the government at face value to a group authorized by Congress, who then tried to sell the coins at a profit to the public. The new pieces then came on to the secondary market, and in early 1936 all earlier commemoratives sold at a premium to their issue prices. The apparent easy profits to be made by purchasing and holding commemoratives attracted many to begin collecting coins, and to seek to purchase the new issues. Congress authorized an explosion of commemoratives in 1936; no fewer than fifteen were issued for the first time. One coin authorized and issued in 1936 was the Cincinnati Musical Center half dollar, controlled and profited from by Thomas G. Melish and issued to celebrate a nonexistent anniversary. At the request of the groups authorized to purchase them, several half dollars minted in previous years were produced again, dated 1936, senior among them the Oregon Trail Memorial half dollar, first struck in 1926.

By April 1936, Congress had reacted to these practices, adding protections to commemorative coinage bills. These included a requirement that all coins be struck at a single mint, rather than all three then operating as with earlier issues (the use of mint marks would force coin collectors to buy three near-identical coins to have a complete set). The market also reacted, with many of the new issues failing to sell out, and prices dropping on the secondary market by as much as two-thirds. By the end of 1936, the boom in commemorative coins had ended.

== Legislation ==
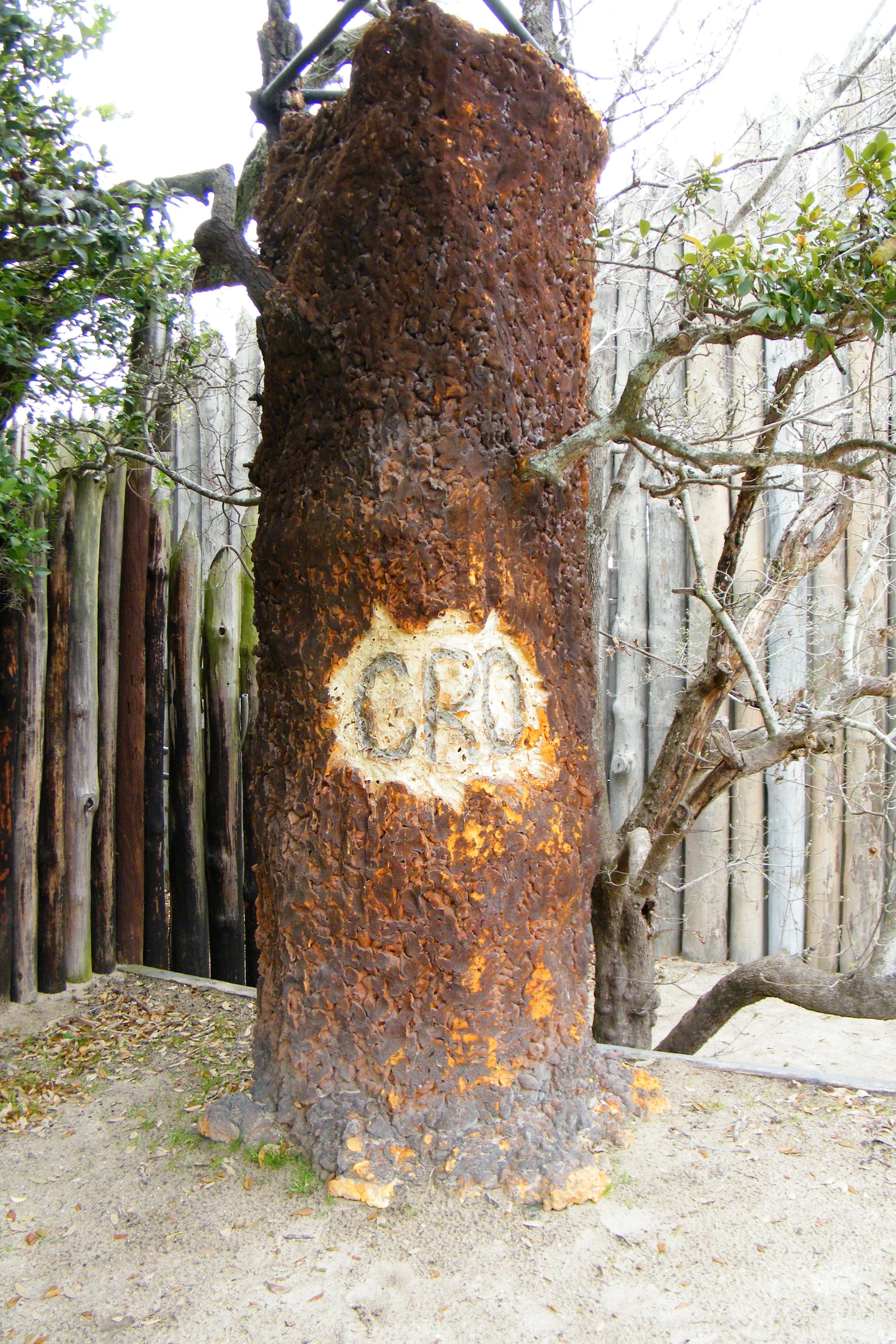
Tree used in The Lost Colony production with "CRO" carved into it

A bill to authorize a Roanoke half dollar was introduced into the United States House of Representatives on May 20, 1936, by Lindsay C. Warren of North Carolina, a Democrat. Rather than being referred to the Committee on Coinage, Weights, and Measures, it was sent to the Committee of the Whole House on the State of the Union for floor consideration. Warren asked unanimous consent to proceed with the bill. Bertrand H. Snell of New York, a Republican, stated that if the House had many more of these bills, he would make a speech in favor of each one of them (presumably to delay them), but as he had been overruled so many times on them, he would not object. Robert F. Rich of Pennsylvania, a Republican, stated that this was the 35th coinage bill that the Democratic majority had brought forward, possibly as a way to inflate the currency, and that they should be careful not to do something they might regret. Neither representative objected, and the bill passed the House without recorded dissent.

The bill then passed to the Senate, and on May 21, 1936, was referred to its Committee on Banking and Currency. The bill emerged from that committee on June 2, 1936, with a report by Democratic Senator Alva Adams of Colorado. Senator Adams had heard of the commemorative coin abuses of the mid-1930s, with low mintages effectively unavailable to the collector, or issuers increasing the number of coins needed for a complete set by having them issued at different mints with different mint marks; and had held hearings on this on March 11, 1936. Adams' committee report noted that the original bill contained "the standardized amendments which have been adopted as a legislative policy" by the committee, including requiring an issue of not less than 25,000 coins at a time, and limiting issuance to a single mint, to be selected by the Director of the Mint, with all coins to be issued before July 1, 1937. The sole charge made to the bill, which had been in commemoration of the anniversary of the colony, Virginia Dare's birth and her baptism, was to delete the reference to her baptism. When the Senate considered the bill on June 6, 1936, it approved the amendment and then the bill, without recorded debate or dissent.

Since the two houses had passed different versions, the bill returned to the House of Representatives. There, on June 16, 1936, Warren moved that the House adopt the Senate amendment. That body agreed to concur in the Senate amendment without recorded debate or dissent. It was enacted into law with the signature of President Franklin D. Roosevelt on June 24, 1936, authorizing an unlimited number of Roanoke half dollars, of which no less than 25,000 could be issued at any one time upon the request of and payment by the Roanoke Memorial Association. No coins could be issued after July 1, 1937.

== Preparation ==
William Marks Simpson, who would later design the Norfolk, Virginia, Bicentennial half dollar, was engaged to design the Roanoke piece. On September 26, 1936, the secretary of the Commission of Fine Arts, H.P. Caemmerer, wrote to Lee Lawrie, sculptor-member of the commission, informing him that Simpson had visited the commission's Washington offices and had left a photograph of a sketch model for the Roanoke coin, which was enclosed. Lawrie approved, and on September 30, the commission chair, Charles S. Moore, transmitted preliminary approval, subject to Simpson sending photographs of his completed models. The initial models differed from the adopted coins in a number of details, including having the date 1936 and his signature rather than a pine sapling.

Simpson reworked his models, redistributing the text on the coin and giving Raleigh's bust on the obverse a truncation which numismatic author Don Taxay described as "more graceful". One change Simpson made was to render Raleigh's last name as "Ralegh", writing to Caemmerer on December 11 to state that Raleigh never called himself that, and most commonly signed his last name as "Ralegh". The commission insisted on the spelling "Raleigh", and Simpson yielded. The sculptor's models were reduced to coin-size hubs by the Medallic Art Company of New York.

== Design ==
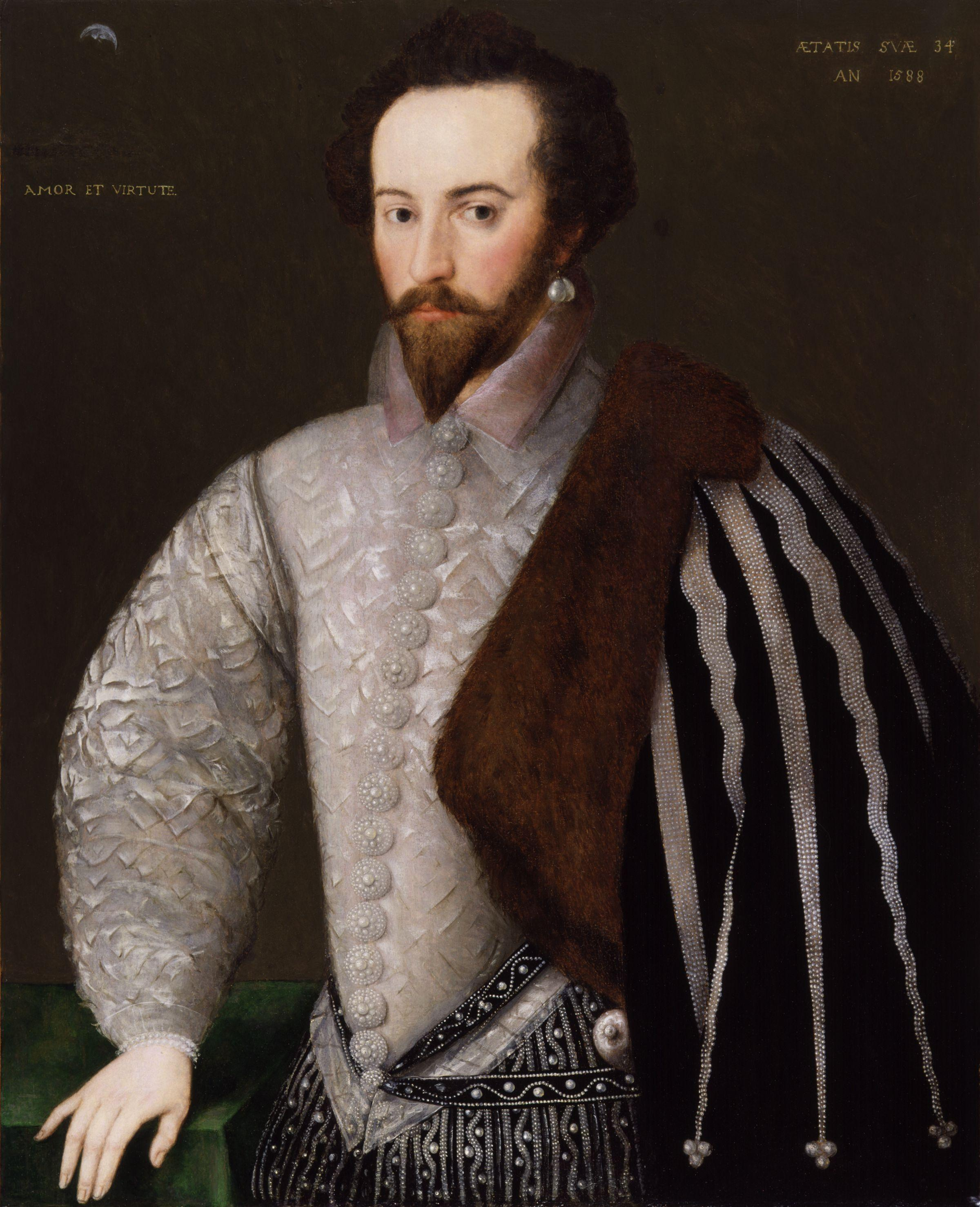
Anonymous painting of Raleigh, 1588

Simpson's design for the obverse features a bust of Sir Walter Raleigh, with his name below. He wears a ruffled collar, an earring, and a feathered hat; the feather intrudes between the words in the name of the country of issue, which rings the upper half of the obverse design. Below Raleigh's shoulder is the artist's monogram, WSM. The denomination of the coin, and the legends LIBERTY and E PLURIBUS UNUM are also on the obverse.

Numismatist Pete Smith described the bust of Raleigh as "a somewhat flattering likeness based on portraits made during Raleigh's life". Art historian Cornelius Vermeule stated of the obverse, "Sir Walter Raleigh resembles the movie actor Errol Flynn, who was specializing in Elizabethan dramatics at the time Simpson was creating this coin." This was seconded by numismatists Anthony Swiatek and Walter Breen in their book on commemoratives, describing the bust as "Errol Flynn posing as Sir Walter Raleigh". Numismatist Bob Bair, in a 2021 article on the three commemorative half dollars designed by Simpson, noted that Flynn did not appear in The Private Lives of Elizabeth and Essex until 1939, two years after the coin was issued, and he did not play Raleigh, but rather, the Earl of Essex.

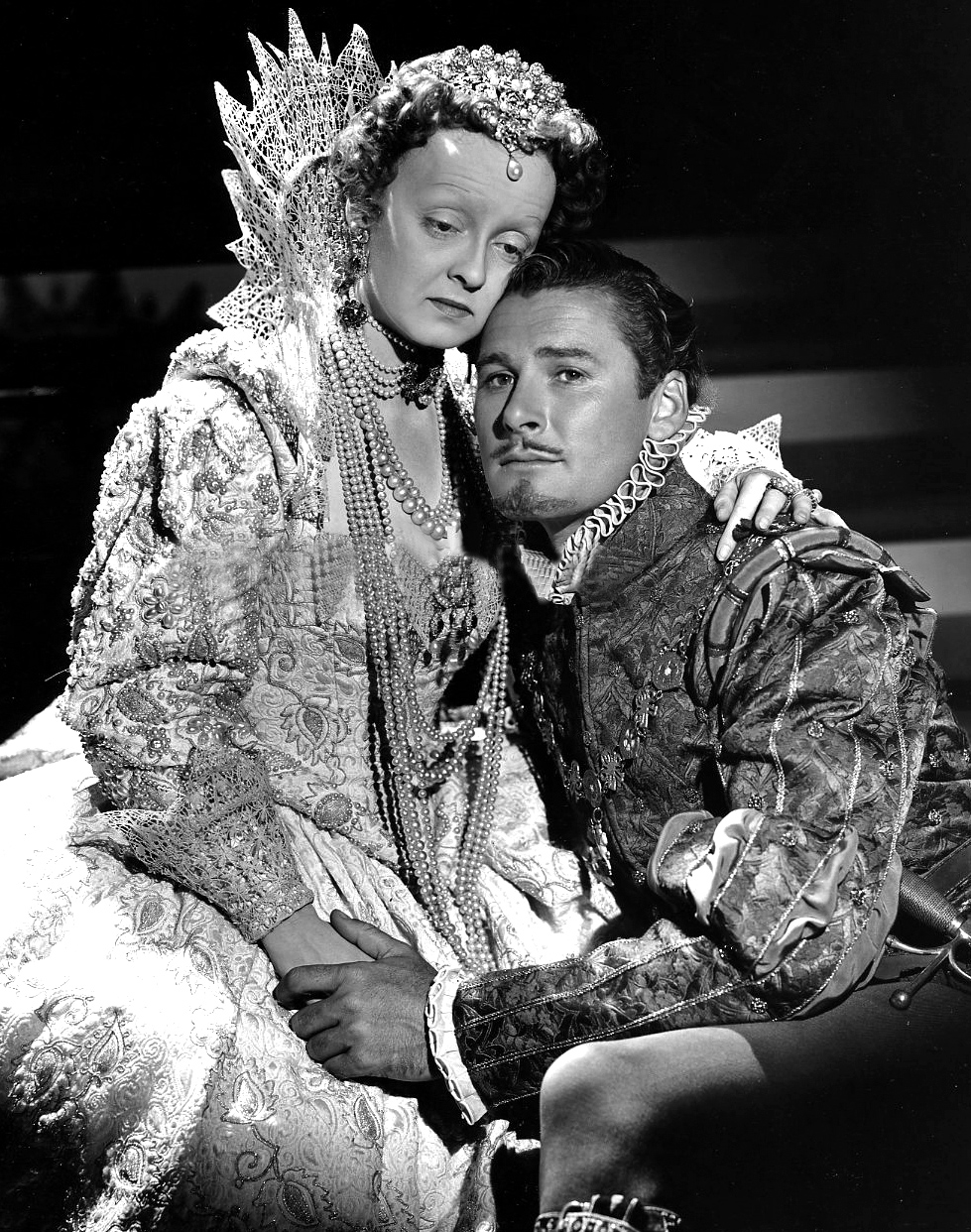
Errol Flynn and Bette Davis in The Private Lives of Elizabeth and Essex (1939)

The reverse depicts Eleanor Dare, holding her daughter Virginia in her arms. While infants had appeared on U.S. coins before (for example, on the 1936 Elgin, Illinois, Centennial half dollar), they had been suggested, but not fully depicted as Virginia is. Also shown are two English sailing ships of the time. According to the brochure accompanying the issue, these were "similar to those in which the Colonists crossed the ocean". Eleanor Dare stands on a pedestal, out of which grows a scrub pine. IN GOD WE TRUST is on one side of Eleanor, below a ship, and the anniversary years as well as commemorative inscriptions marking the colonization of Roanoke and Virginia Dare's birth are on the reverse.

Bair stated that although the obverse received criticism, the reverse was applauded. Simpson wrote that the motif of Eleanor Dare holding her daughter was inspired by a visit to the Wright Brothers National Memorial, which like Roanoke was located in coastal North Carolina, where he saw the guard's wife holding their baby, waiting for her husband to go off duty. "I’ve suggested the young woman holding her child close to her breast gazing far off to the horizon beyond the ships. The sea breeze whips her clothing. I’ve modeled her standing there courageously, facing uncertainty with pride and determination, but always with the thought of her native England."

Vermeule described the reverse as, "the frozen, mannered statue of Virginia Dare in the arms of Ellinor Dare, all set on a pedestal ... is a pure, twentieth-century Neoclassic concept of motherhood, flapping and nobly sentimental even in miniature." He complained that there was too much lettering on the coin, which was too varied in scale. Nevertheless, "in praise of this coin, it is necessary to note its unusual flavor, differing somewhat from the usual iconography of founder and early settler commemorative half-dollars."

== Release, distributing and collecting ==
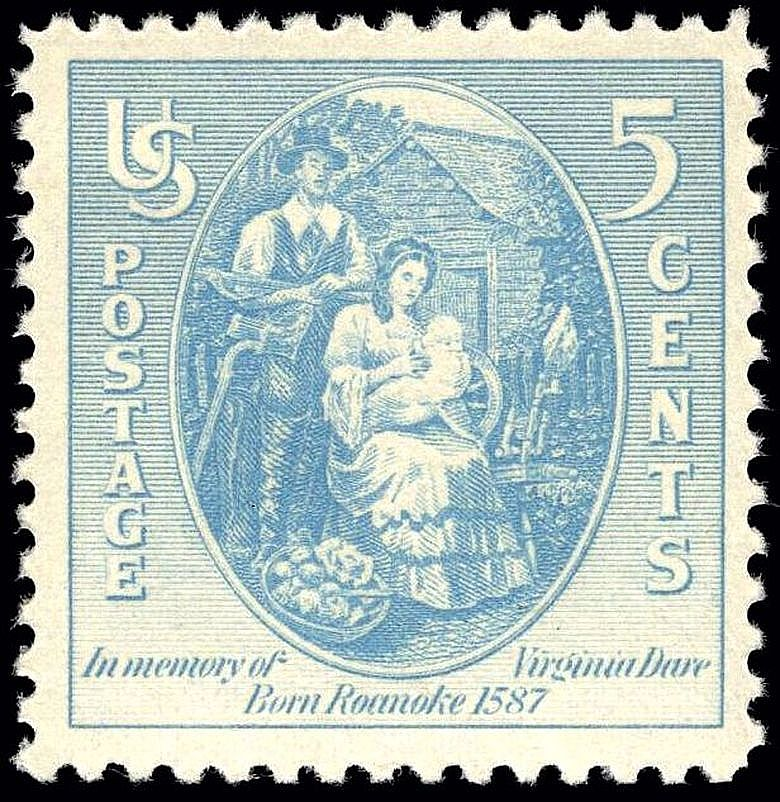
Virginia Dare postage stamp, 1937

An initial quantity of 25,000 half dollars, plus 15 pieces reserved for inspection and testing by the Assay Commission, were struck in January 1937 at the Philadelphia Mint. These were offered for sale by the memorial association, at a cost of $1.65 including postage. In May 1937, D.B. Fearing, chair of the Roanoke Island Historical Association (which was selling the coins, as was the Memorial Association), urged collectors not to pay from two to three dollars to buy the coin from a dealer: "There are several instances which have been reported to us in detail where dealers have declared the issue of this commemorative piece exhausted. That is definitely not so. We have approximately 8000 of these half dollars available to order ... All proceeds from the sale of these coins will be used in defraying expenses incidental and appropriate to the commemorative festival. So when a dealer claims this issue is exhausted he is talking through his hat."

A further 25,015 pieces, also including 15 pieces for the Assay Commission, were struck in June. Pursuant to the authorizing act, no more could be ordered by the memorial association after July 1, 1937. They were available in time for the August 1937 celebration of the anniversary on Roanoke Island, which featured a production of an outdoor drama, The Lost Colony, which has been produced on an annual basis there since then. The United States Post Office Department issued a postage stamp to commemorate the anniversary, with the design based on the coin's reverse. Purchasers of the coin by mail were invited to spend an additional $.55 to buy the booklet A History of the Roanoke Island Settlement. The coins came too late to capitalize on the 1936 commemorative coin boom, and 21,000 were returned to the Mint for redemption and melting.

The Roanoke coin could be purchased in uncirculated condition for about $1.50 in 1940, $2.50 in 1950, $30 in 1970, and $540 during the second commemorative coin boom in 1980. The deluxe edition of R. S. Yeoman's A Guide Book of United States Coins, published in 2020, lists the coin for between $135 and $250, depending on condition. An exceptional specimen sold for $5,170 in 2015.

== Sources ==
- Bair, Bob (May 2021). "A Tale of three commemorative half dollars". The Numismatist. 134 (5): 46–53.
- Bowers, Q. David (1992). Commemorative Coins of the United States: A Complete Encyclopedia. Wolfeboro, New Hampshire: Bowers and Merena Galleries, Inc. ISBN 978-0-943161-35-8.
- Bullowa, David M. (1938). "The Commemorative Coinage of the United States 1892–1938". Numismatic Notes and Monographs (83). New York: American Numismatic Society: i–192. JSTOR 43607181. (subscription required)
- Flynn, Kevin (2008). The Authoritative Reference on Commemorative Coins 1892–1954. Roswell, Georgia: Kyle Vick. OCLC 711779330.
- Slabaugh, Arlie R. (1975). United States Commemorative Coinage (second ed.). Racine, Wisconsin: Whitman Publishing. ISBN 978-0-307-09377-6.
- Smith, Pete (February 1998). "Commem marks Raleigh's failed colony". The Numismatist. 111 (2): 181–182.
- Swiatek, Anthony (2012). Encyclopedia of the Commemorative Coins of the United States. Chicago: KWS Publishers. ISBN 978-0-9817736-7-4.
- Swiatek, Anthony; Breen, Walter (1981). The Encyclopedia of United States Silver & Gold Commemorative Coins, 1892 to 1954. New York: Arco Publishing. ISBN 978-0-668-04765-4.
- Taxay, Don (1967). An Illustrated History of U.S. Commemorative Coinage. New York: Arco Publishing. ISBN 978-0-668-01536-3.
- United States Senate Committee on Banking and Currency (March 11, 1936). Coinage of commemorative 50-cent pieces. United States Government Printing Office – via Congressional ProQuest.(subscription required)
- United States Senate Committee on Banking and Currency (June 2, 1936). Coins in Commemoration of the Three Hundred and Fiftieth Anniversary Birth of Virginia Dare, etc – via Congressional ProQuest. (subscription required)
- Vermeule, Cornelius (1971). Numismatic Art in America. Cambridge, Massachusetts: The Belknap Press of Harvard University Press. ISBN 978-0-674-62840-3.
- Yeoman, R. S. (2020). A Guide Book of United States Coins (Mega Red 5th ed.). Atlanta, Georgia: Whitman Publishing, LLC. ISBN 978-0-7948-4705-0.
