= Burnside's Bridge =

Historic bridge in Maryland, United States

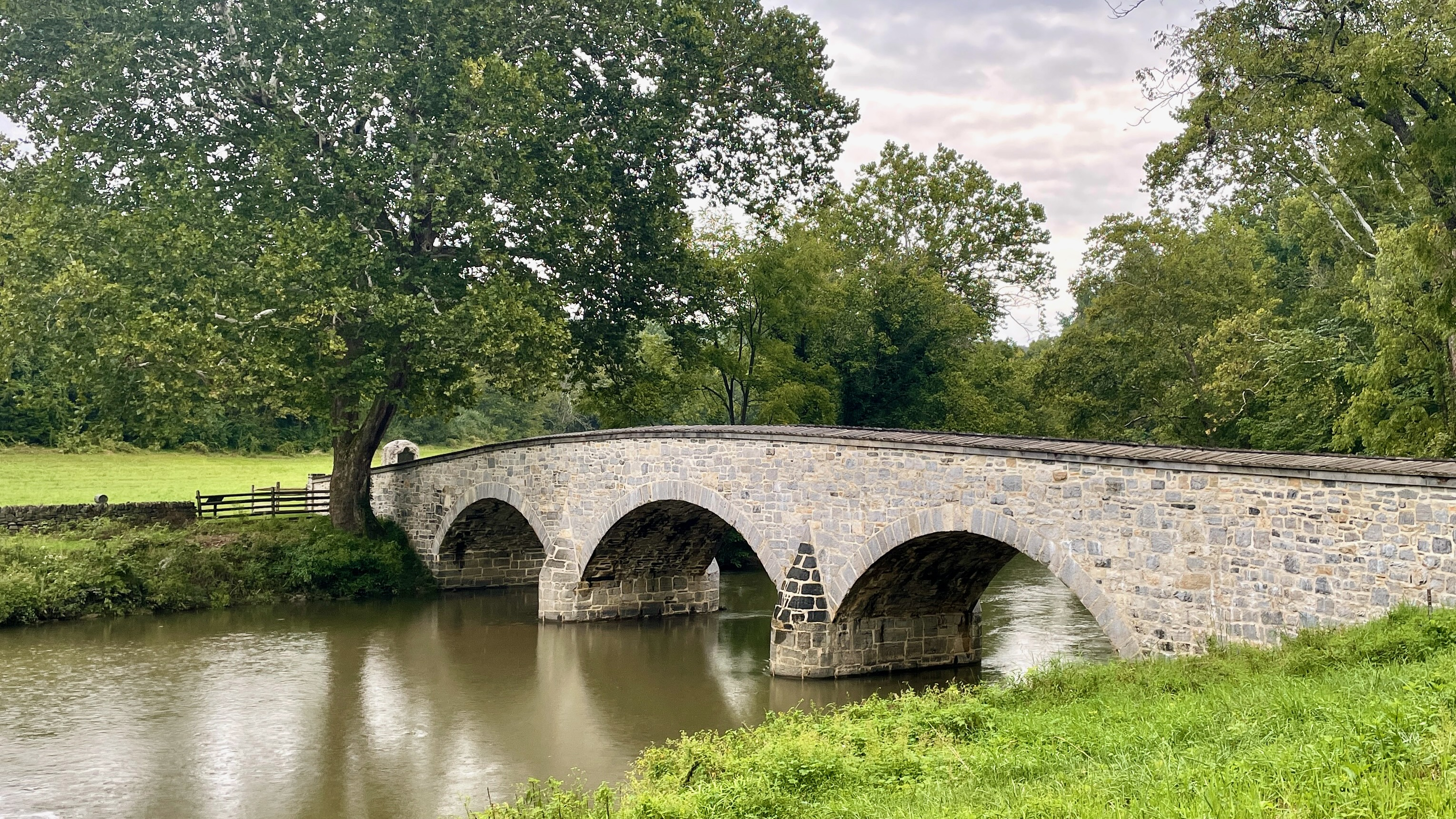
- Coordinates: 39°27′02″N 77°43′55″W
- Carries: Pedestrians
- Crosses: Antietam Creek
- Locale: Sharpsburg, Maryland

Characteristics
- Design: Arch
- Material: Stone

History
- Opened: 1836

Location
- Interactive map of Burnside's Bridge

Burnside's Bridge is a landmark on the U.S. Civil War Antietam National Battlefield near Sharpsburg, northwestern Maryland. Built in 1836, it played a notable role in the 1862 battle.

== History ==
=== Construction ===
Seeking to improve connections between roads in Washington County, fourteen bridges were commissioned to be constructed. It is one of five bridges designed by master bridge builder John Weaver, and construction was completed in 1836. It was constructed by local Dunker farmers. The three-arched, 12-foot (3.7 m)-wide, 125-foot (38 m)-long bridge provided a passageway over Antietam Creek for farmers to take their produce and livestock to market in nearby Sharpsburg. The bridge's three arches are constructed of locally quarried coursed limestone, with masonry walls containing the roadbed and surmounted by parapets. The original cost of construction was $3,200 (now between $73,000 and $84,000).

The bridge has two other names: "Rohrbach's Bridge", after a local farmer, Henry Rohrbach, and "Lower Bridge", which is relative to the Upper Bridge and Middle Bridge located further upstream.

=== Battle of Antietam ===
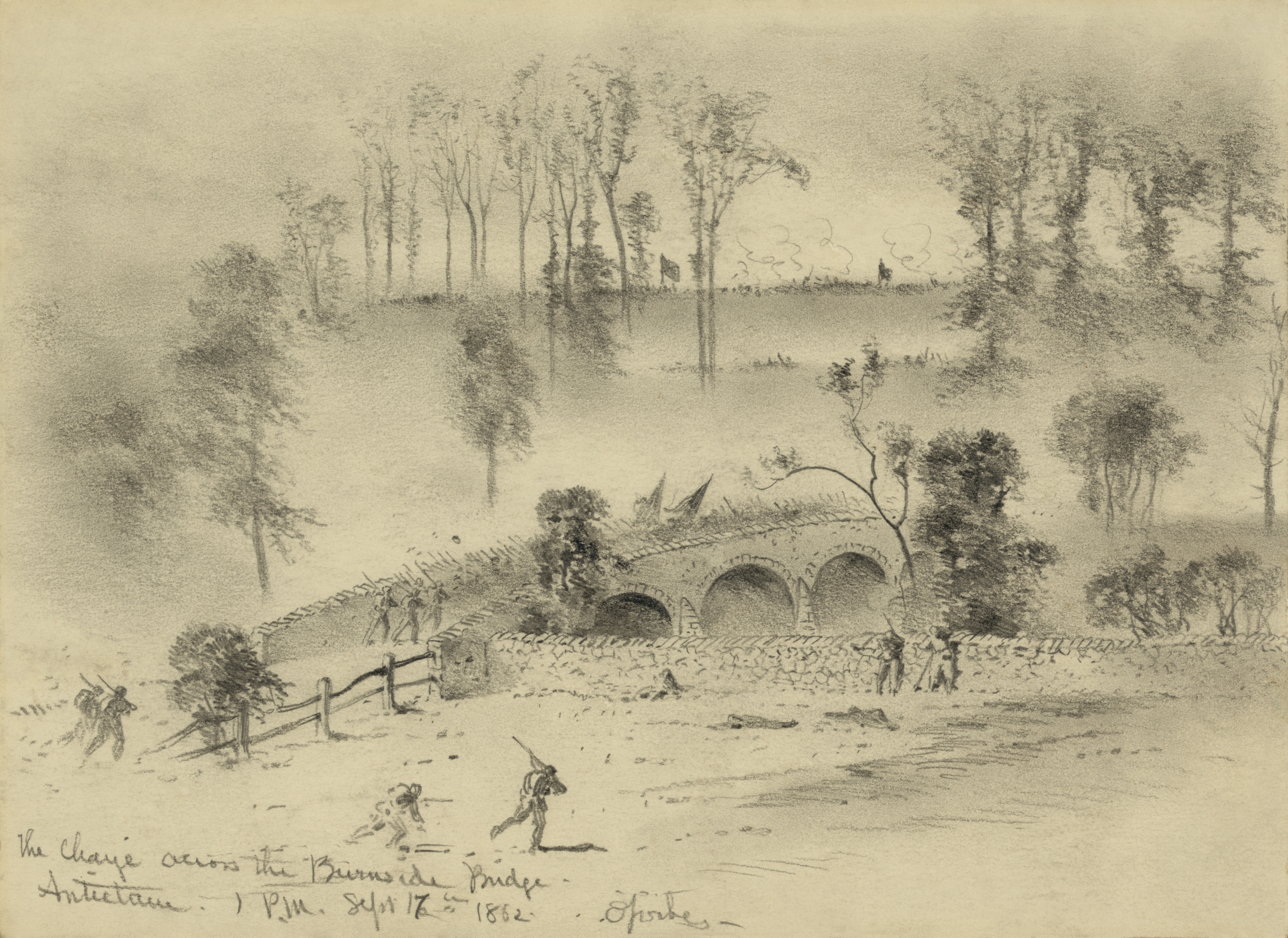
Charge of the 51st New York Infantry and 51st Pennsylvania Infantry regiments across Burnside's Bridge, by Edwin Forbes.

Crossing over Antietam Creek, the bridge played a key role in the September 1862 Battle of Antietam during the American Civil War when around 500 Confederate soldiers from Georgia under General Robert Toombs and Henry Benning, for several hours held off repeated attempts by elements of the Union Army's IX Army Corps, whose leader was Major General Ambrose E. Burnside, to take the bridge.

The first attempt was by Colonel George Crook's Ohio brigade, partially supported by Edward Harland's brigade of Rodman's Division, but the Ohioans emerged too far upstream. The 11th Connecticut Infantry found the bridge, and engaged the Georgians under Toombs. After taking heavy casualties, the 11th Connecticut withdrew in all haste.

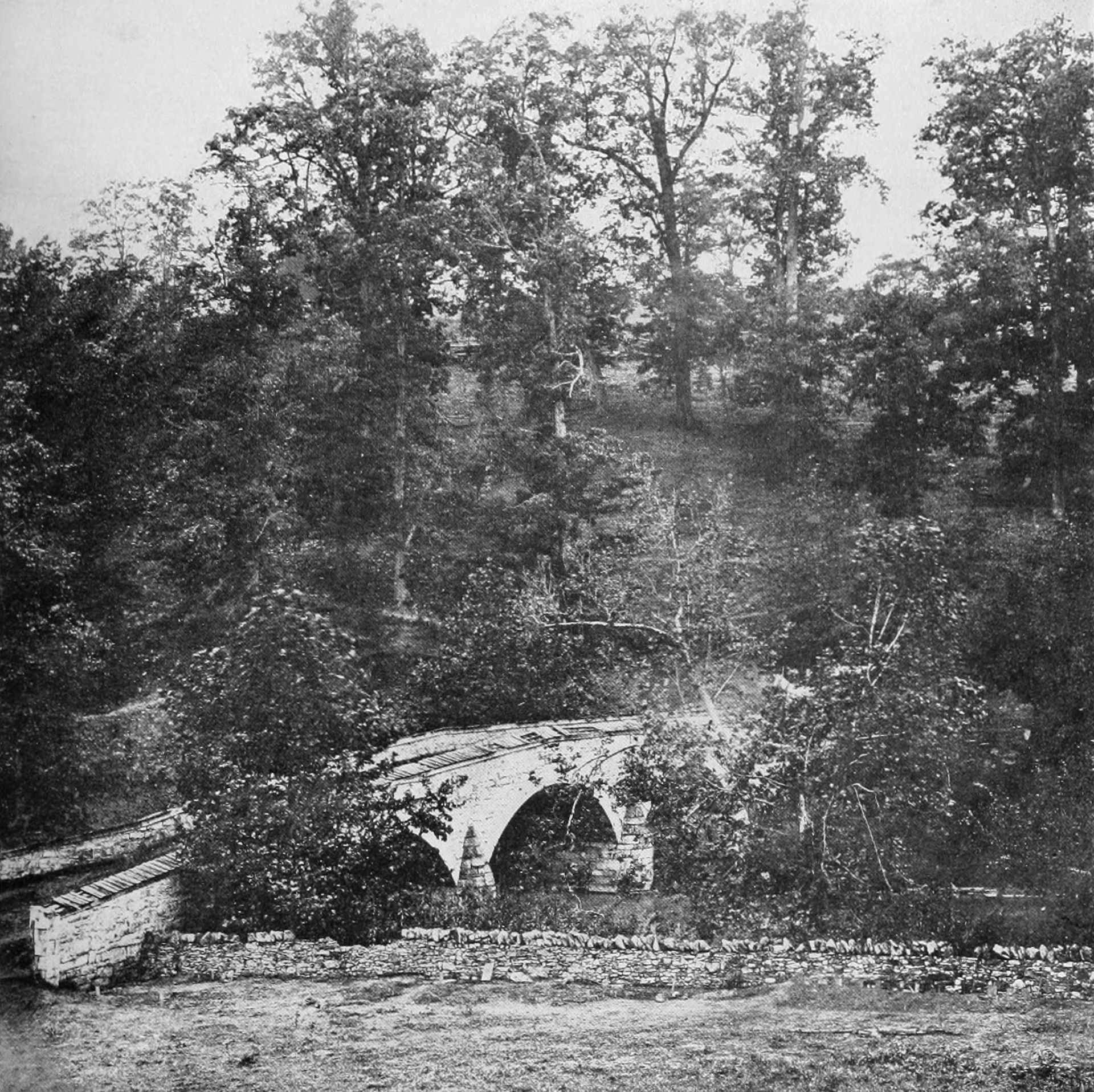
Confederate guns on the hill above poured fire into the Union ranks at Burnside's bridge. Photo taken just after the Battle of Antietam, 1862.

The second try to carry the bridge was by the 2nd Division's 1st Brigade under James Nagle – the 2nd Maryland & the 6th New Hampshire Infantry rushed to the bridge via a nearby farm road but was stopped by the Georgia sharpshooters before getting halfway to the bridge. Toombs's 450 Georgians held off 14,000 Union attackers.

Finally, the 51st New York Volunteer Infantry and the 51st Pennsylvania Infantry, from Brigadier General Edward Ferrero's brigade, attacked from the field on the Union side of the creek, stopped briefly at the walls near the bridge to duel with the sharpshooters, and then charged the bridge and seized it, but not before the attack had been delayed for several hours beyond what had been expected.

=== Landmark ===
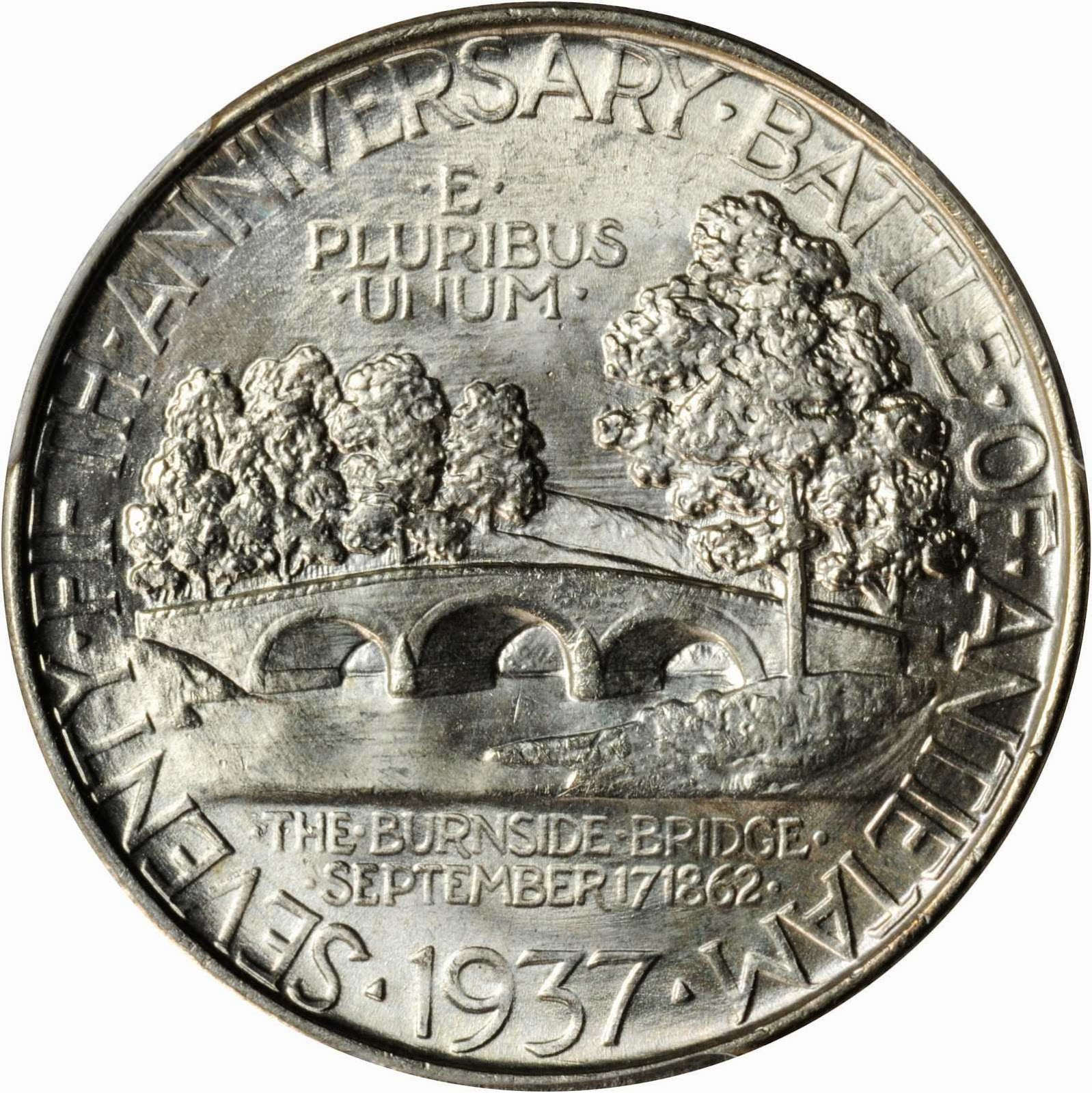
1937 commemorative half dollar

After the war, the U.S. government acquired the bridge and adjoining land, now in Antietam National Battlefield. Vehicular traffic across the bridge was stopped and the original farm lanes leading to the bridge were allowed to grow over with grass. Foot traffic is still permitted on the structure. It remains as one of the most photographed bridges of the Civil War. In 1937, the bridge was depicted on the reverse of the Battle of Antietam half dollar.
