= Guadalcanal American Memorial =

World War II monument in the Solomon Islands

Coordinates: 9°26′33″S 159°57′27″E

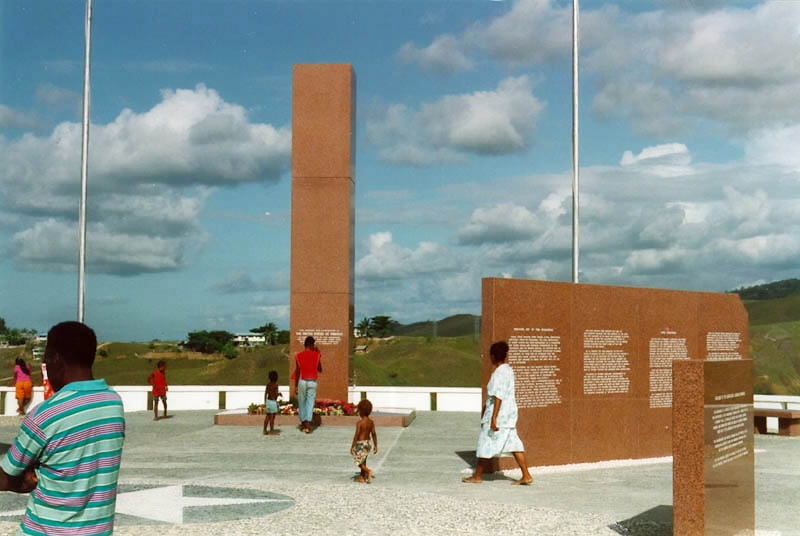
Guadalcanal American Memorial

The Guadalcanal American Memorial is a World War II monument on Guadalcanal in Solomon Islands. Dedicated on August 7, 1992, it was established as a tribute to the Americans and their allies who lost their lives during the Guadalcanal Campaign from 7 August 1942 to 9 February 1943. The capital city of Honiara is to its north. To mark the 50th anniversary of the Red Beach landings, the U.S. War Memorial was dedicated on 7 August 1992. An account of this is also inscribed on red marble tablets inside the monument compound. The memorial was a joint effort of the American Battle Monuments Commission (ABMC) and the Guadalcanal-Solomon Islands Memorial Commission, and was at the initiative of Robert F Reynolds, Chief of Valors Tours Ltd. The memorial is maintained by the ABMC. Every year on 7 August, a commemorative ceremony is held to mark the first day of the battle. Another monument, erected by the Japanese on Mount Austen, is a tribute to the Japanese who lost their lives.

== Background ==
The US Navy, Marine Corps, Army and their allies fought the forces of the Empire of Japan at Guadalcanal during World War II from August 7, 1942, to February 9, 1943, to take control of the island where the Japanese had established a strong base. During the six-month period, bitter fighting took place on land, in the air, and at sea, until the Japanese voluntarily withdrew after several setbacks in the seven major naval battles and clashes in the air. The American forces were ultimately victorious. The Japanese evacuated the island from Cape Esperance on the north west coast in February 1943.

The bitter struggle that took place in which both "slugged it out toe to toe", resulted in loss of 1200 aircraft, 49 ships and as many as 35,000 American and Japanese men. It was uncertain as to who would ultimately prevail. When the Japanese capitulated and withdrew, the Japanese Major General Kiyotake Kawaguchi who was assigned the task of destroying the American Marines said "Guadalcanal is not the name of an island. It is the graveyard of the Japanese Army". The conflict turned the tide against Japan and it was a decisive battle of the Pacific War, won by the effective joint action of all arms and services of the United States, and in which the marines played a crucial part.

Japanese losses were immense, including 800 aircraft and 2362 pilots and crew. The Americans lost 24 warships totaling 126,240 tons, but had the resources to recoup their losses, and American dead were one tenth of the total 50,000 deaths in the battle. It was in this battle that the legend of "the invincibility of the Japanese soldier and Zero fighter plane" were destroyed.

In this longest campaign of the Pacific War, 65,000 American forces committed were from the US Marine Corps, US Ground Forces and US Navy construction units. The combined losses of all these forces amounted to: Killed including from injuries and missing were 1,342 of the Marine Corps and wounded were 3,170; US Navy lost 4,737 including missing at sea and 2,344 were wounded; US Army's Americal Division lost 344 while 855 were wounded; US 25th Infantry division (late entrant into the battle) lost 216 with 439 wounded; USAAF Thirteenth Air force lost 93 while many were injured; US Navy lost 41 airmen and the Marine corps air arm lost many but their number has not been disclosed. Americans who were taken prisoner were never heard of again.

== Features ==
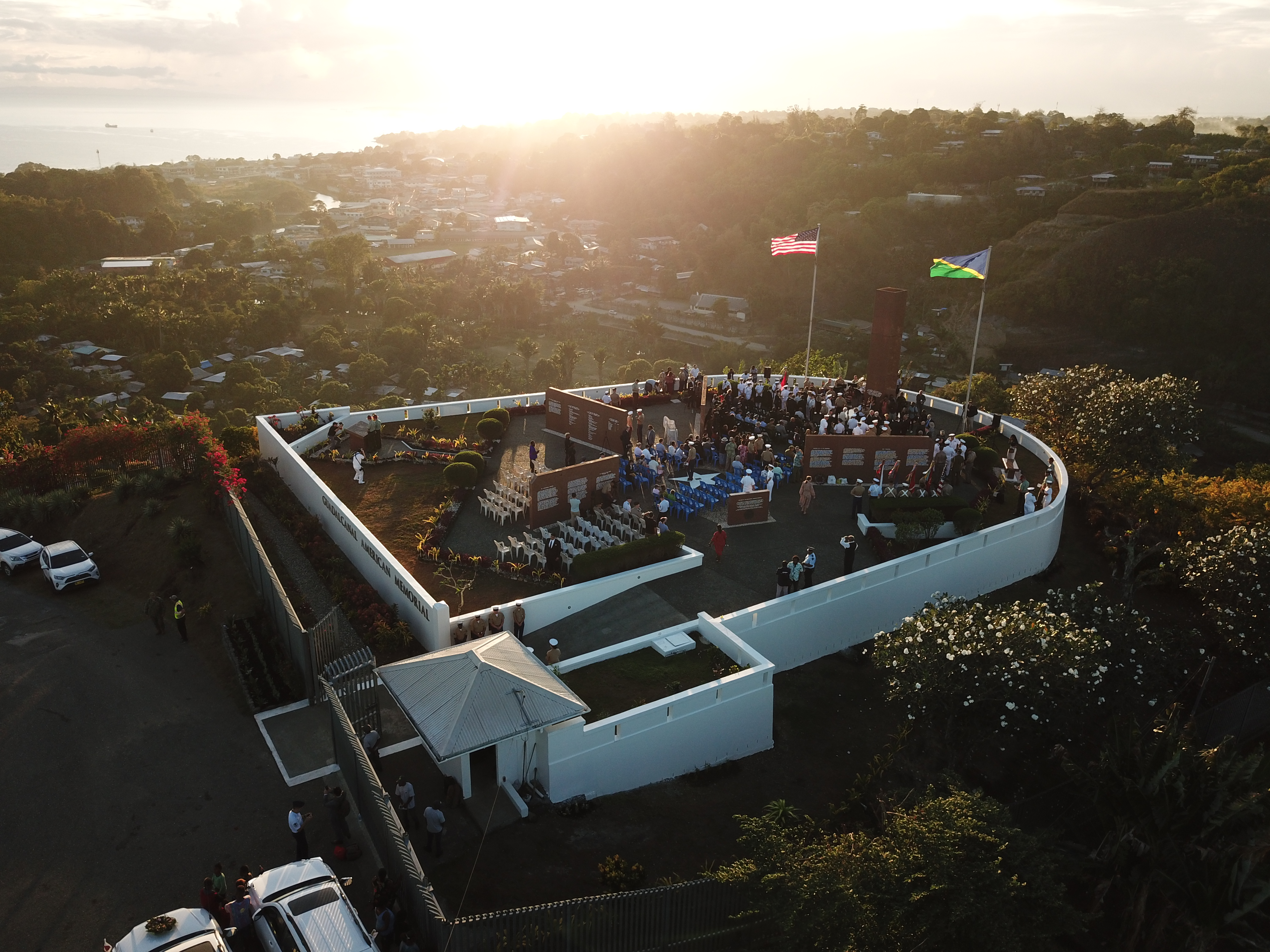
Aerial view of the memorial during a ceremony

The memorial is located on Skyway Drive on a hillock (the first hill that was occupied by the US forces) overlooking the Pacific Ocean. It is to the west of the Matanikau River, which was the battle front for many months between the Americans and the Japanese, with a commanding view of Mount Austen and Ironbottom Sound. In the shape of a pylon, the memorial is spread over a large area. The main memorial is 4 by 4 feet (1.2 m × 1.2 m) in size and 24 feet (7.3 m) in height. The four fascia of the monument are oriented towards the four directions where the battles were fought. The details of the five battles and the names of ships (of the US and its Allies) that were lost during the operations are inscribed on marble plaques. The plaques give a brief description of the five battles fought – Bloody Ridge ("Edson's Ridge"), Tassafaronga at Ironbottom Sound, New Georgia Island (which was the Solomon Island campaign), Cape Esperance and Mount Austen.

The memorial inscription reads:

"This memorial has been erected by the
United States of America
in humble tribute to its sons and its allies
who paid the ultimate sacrifice
for the liberation of the Solomon Islands
1942–1943"

== Bibliography ==
- American Battle Monuments Commission (1991). The American Battle Monuments Commission World War II Commemorative program. The Commission.
- Frank, Richard B. (1992). Guadalcanal: The Definitive Account of the Landmark Battle. Penguin Group US. ISBN 978-0140165616.
- Jersey, Stanley Coleman (2008). Hell's Islands: The Untold Story of Guadalcanal. Texas A&M University Press. ISBN 978-1585446162.
- Twining, Merrill B. (2007). No Bended Knee: The Battle for Guadalcanal. Random House Publishing Group. ISBN 978-0307416209.
- Leckie, Robert (1965). Challenge for the Pacific: The Bloody Six-month Battle of Guadalcanal. Da Capo Press. ISBN 978-0306809118.
- Stanley, David (2000). Moon Handbooks South Pacific. David Stanley. p. 999. ISBN 978-1566911726.
- Stanley, David (2004). Moon Handbooks South Pacific. David Stanley. p. 998. ISBN 978-1566914116.
- Thompson, Chuck (2002). The 25 Best World War II Sites: Pacific Theater: The Ultimate Traveler's Guide to the Battlefields, Monuments and Museums. ASDavis Media Group. ISBN 978-0966635263.
- United States. Congress. House. Committee on Veterans' Affairs. Subcommittee on Housing and Memorial Affairs (1994). Oversight of H.J. Res. 131, National Cemetery System, American Battle Monuments Commission, and Arlington National Cemetery: Hearing Before the Subcommittee on Housing and Memorial Affairs of the Committee on Veterans' Affairs, House of Representatives, One Hundred Third Congress, Second Session, May 24, 1994. U.S. Government Printing Office. ISBN 978-0160463983.
