= Marquis de Lafayette =

French military officer and politician (1757–1834)

Lieutenant General The Marquis de La Fayette ORMSL
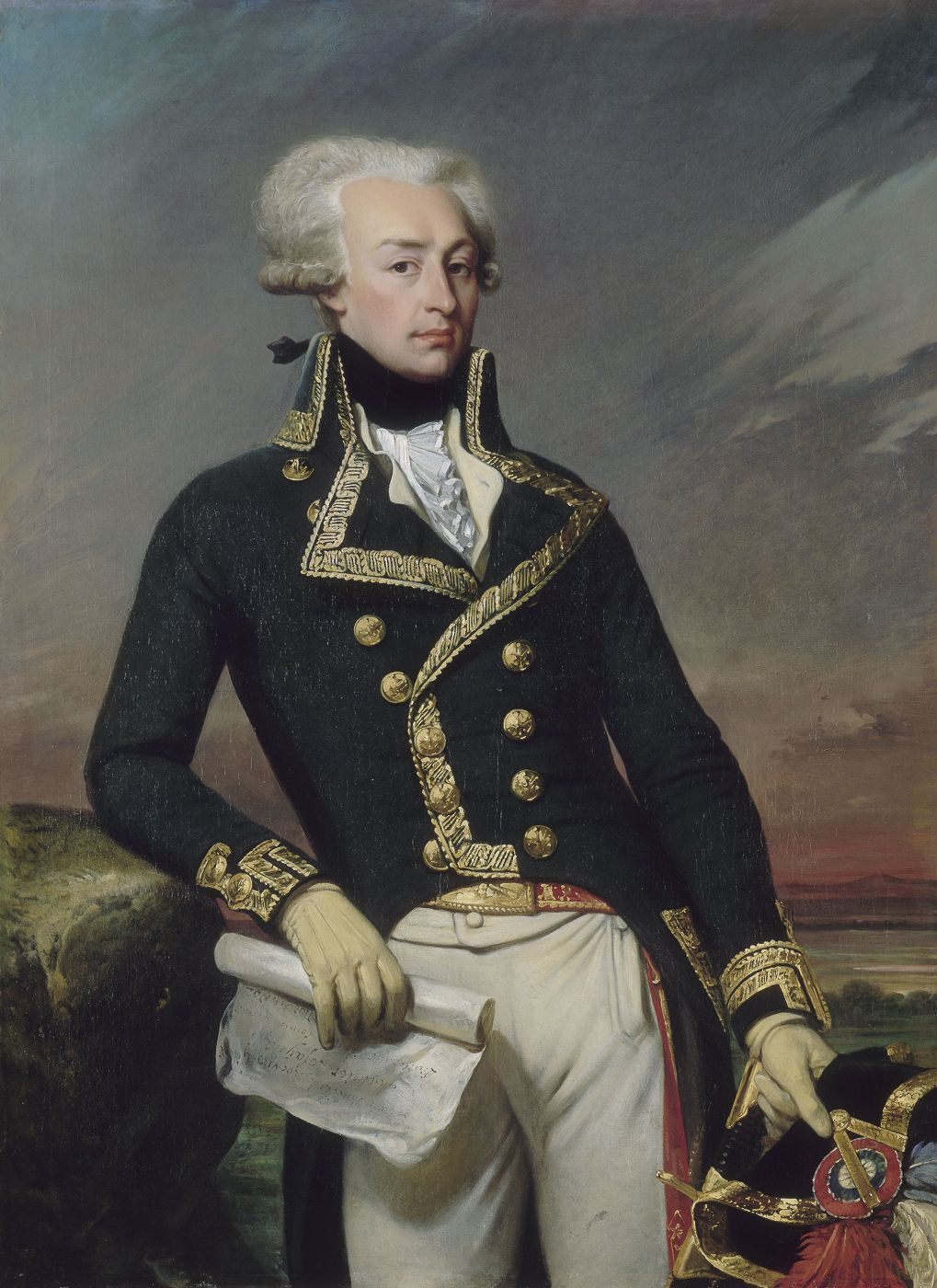
- Born: Marie-Joseph Paul Yves Roch Gilbert du Motier; September 6, 1757; Château de Chavaniac, Auvergne, France
- Died: May 20, 1834 (aged 76); Paris, France
- Spouse: Adrienne de Noailles (m. 1774; died 1807)
- Children: 4, including Georges Washington
- Military career
- Allegiance: Kingdom of France (1771–1777, 1781–1792, 1814/15–1830); United States (1777–1781); French First Republic (1792)
- Branch: French Royal Army; Continental Army; National Guard (France)
- Service years: 1771–1792; 1830
- Rank: Major general (U.S.); Lieutenant Général (France)
- Nickname: The Hero of the Two Worlds (Le Héros des Deux Mondes)
- Conflicts: American Revolutionary War; Battle of Brandywine; Battle of Gloucester; Valley Forge; Battle of Barren Hill; Battle of Rhode Island; Battle of Monmouth; Battle of Green Spring; Siege of Yorktown; French Revolution; March on Versailles; Day of Daggers; Champ de Mars massacre; War of the First Coalition; July Revolution; June Rebellion
- Awards: Order of Saint Louis

Marie-Joseph Paul Yves Roch Gilbert du Motier, Marquis de La Fayette (Note: His full name is rarely used; instead he is often referred to as the Marquis de La Fayette, Lafayette, or General Lafayette. Only the one-word spelling is used in the United States. In France, the original two-word spelling is usually used. Biographer Louis R. Gottschalk says that Lafayette spelled his name both Lafayette and La Fayette. Other historians differ on the spelling of Lafayette's name: Lafayette, La Fayette, and LaFayette. Contemporaries often used La Fayette, similar to his ancestor, the novelist Madame de La Fayette; however, his immediate family wrote Lafayette.) (French: [ʒilbɛʁ dy mɔtje maʁki d(ə) la fajɛt]; September 6, 1757 – May 20, 1834), known in the United States as Lafayette (/ˌlɑːfiˈɛt, ˌlæf-/), was a French military officer and politician who volunteered to join the Continental Army, led by General George Washington, in the American Revolutionary War. Lafayette commanded Continental Army troops in the decisive siege of Yorktown in 1781, the Revolutionary War's final major battle, which secured American independence. After returning to France, Lafayette became a key figure in the French Revolution of 1789 and the July Revolution of 1830 and continues to be celebrated as a hero in both France and the United States.

Lafayette was born into a wealthy land-owning family in Chavaniac in the province of Auvergne in south-central France. He followed the family's martial tradition and was commissioned an officer at age 13. He became convinced that the American revolutionary cause was noble, and he traveled to the Americas seeking glory in it. He was made a major general at age 19 but was initially not given American troops to command. He fought with the Continental Army at the Battle of Brandywine near Chadds Ford, Pennsylvania, where he was wounded but organized an orderly retreat, and he served with distinction in the Battle of Rhode Island. In the middle of the war, he returned home to France to lobby for an increase in French support for the American Revolution. He returned to America in 1780 and was given senior positions in the Continental Army. In 1781, troops under his command in Virginia blocked a British army led by Lord Cornwallis until other American and French forces could position themselves for the decisive siege of Yorktown.

Lafayette returned to France and was appointed to the Assembly of Notables in 1787, convened in response to the fiscal crisis. He was elected a member of the Estates General of 1789, where representatives met from the three traditional orders of French society: the clergy, the nobility, and the commoners. After the National Constituent Assembly was formed, he helped to write the Declaration of the Rights of Man and of the Citizen with Thomas Jefferson's assistance. This document was inspired by the United States Declaration of Independence, which was authored primarily by Jefferson, and invoked natural law to establish basic principles of the democratic nation-state. He also advocated the abolition of slavery, in keeping with the philosophy of natural rights. After the storming of the Bastille, he was appointed commander-in-chief of France's National Guard and tried to steer a middle course through the years of revolution. In August 1792, radical factions ordered his arrest, and he fled to the Austrian Netherlands. He was captured by Austrian troops and spent more than five years in prison.

Lafayette returned to France after Napoleon Bonaparte secured his release in 1797, though he refused to participate in Napoleon's government. After the Bourbon Restoration of 1814, he became a liberal member of the Chamber of Deputies, a position which he held for most of the remainder of his life. In 1824, President James Monroe invited him to the United States as the nation's guest, where he visited all 24 states in the union and met a rapturous reception. During France's July Revolution of 1830, he declined an offer to become the French dictator. Instead, he supported Louis-Philippe as king, but turned against him when the monarch became autocratic. He died on May 20, 1834, and is buried in Picpus Cemetery in Paris, under soil from Bunker Hill. He is sometimes known as "The Hero of the Two Worlds" for his accomplishments in the service of both France and the United States.

== Early life ==
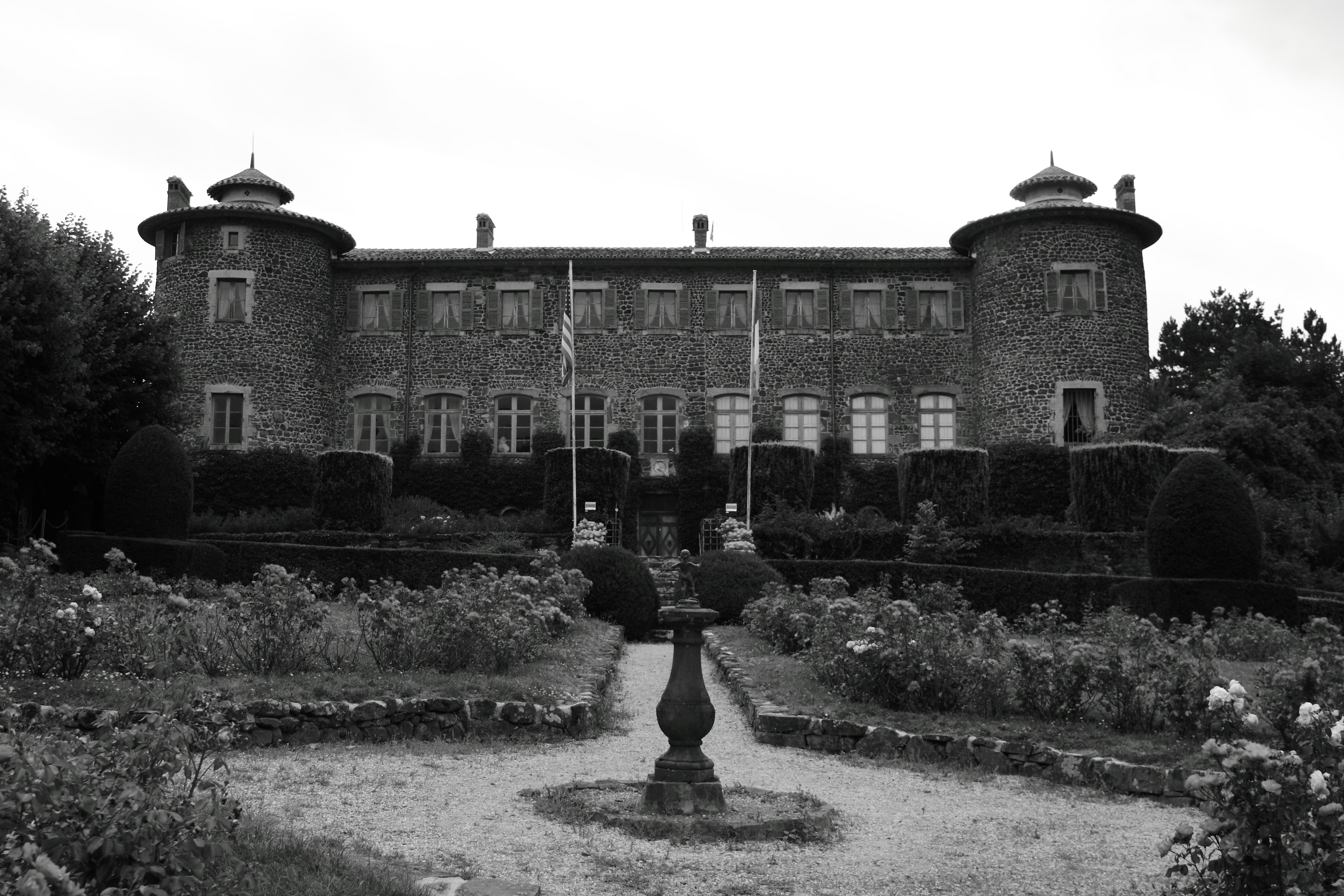
Lafayette's birthplace in Chavaniac, Auvergne

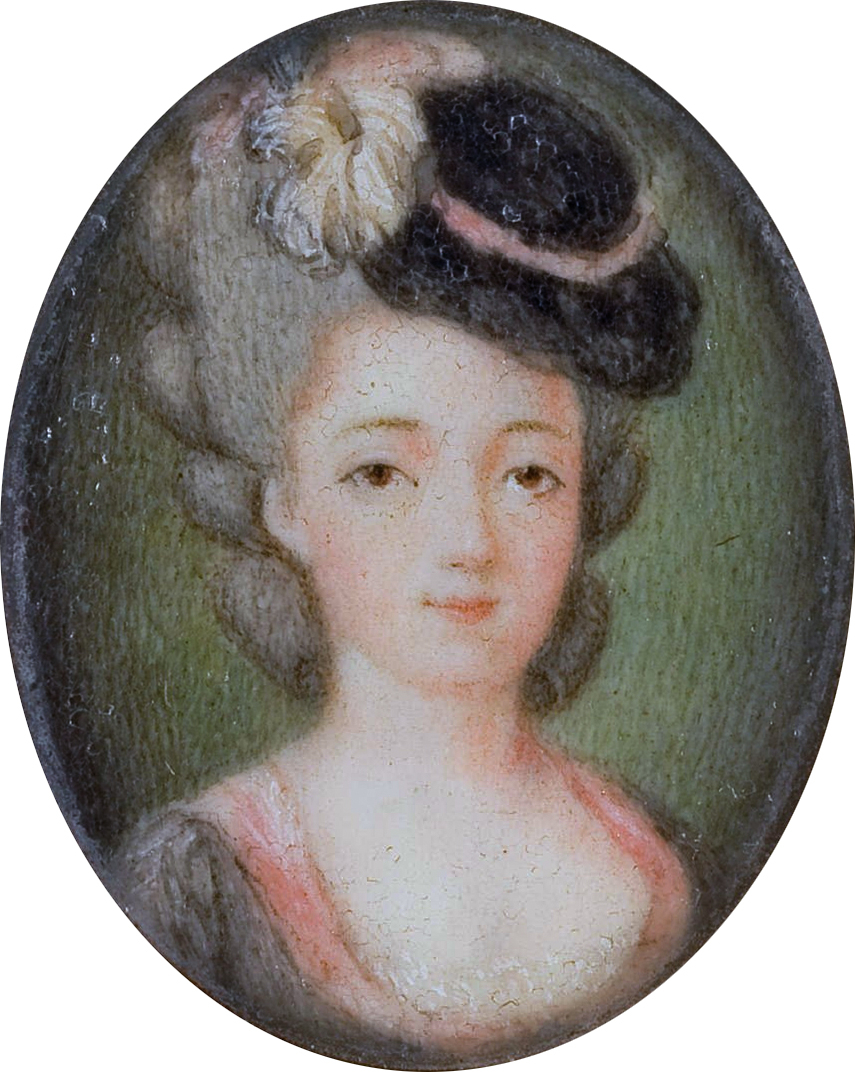
Lafayette's wife, Marie Adrienne Francoise

Lafayette was born on September 6, 1757, to Michel Louis Christophe Roch Gilbert Paulette du Motier, Marquis de La Fayette, colonel of grenadiers, and Marie Louise Jolie de La Rivière, at the Château de Chavaniac, in Chavaniac-Lafayette, near Le Puy-en-Velay, in the province of Auvergne (now Haute-Loire).

Lafayette's lineage was likely one of the oldest and most distinguished in Auvergne and, perhaps, in all of France. Males of the Lafayette family enjoyed a reputation for courage and chivalry and were noted for their contempt for danger. One of Lafayette's early ancestors, Gilbert de Lafayette III, a Marshal of France, had been a companion-at-arms of Joan of Arc's army during the Siege of Orléans in 1429. According to legend, another ancestor acquired the crown of thorns during the Sixth Crusade.

His non-Lafayette ancestors are also notable; his great-grandfather (his mother's maternal grandfather) was the Comte de La Rivière, until his death in 1770 commander of the Mousquetaires du Roi, or "Black Musketeers", King Louis XV's personal horse guard. Lafayette's paternal uncle Jacques-Roch died on January 18, 1734, while fighting the Austrians at Milan in the War of the Polish Succession; upon his death, the title of marquis passed to his brother Michel.

Lafayette's father likewise died on the battlefield. On August 1, 1759, Michel de Lafayette was struck by a cannonball while fighting an Anglo-German army at the Battle of Minden in Westphalia. Lafayette became marquis and Lord of Chavaniac, but the estate went to his mother. Perhaps devastated by the loss of her husband, she went to live in Paris with her father and grandfather, leaving Lafayette to be raised in Chavaniac-Lafayette by his paternal grandmother, Mme de Chavaniac, who had brought the château into the family with her dowry.

In 1768, when Lafayette was 11, he was summoned to Paris to live with his mother and great-grandfather at the comte's apartments in Luxembourg Palace. The boy was sent to school at the Collège du Plessis, part of the University of Paris, and it was decided that he would carry on the family martial tradition. The comte, the boy's great-grandfather, enrolled the boy in a program to train future Musketeers. Lafayette's mother and grandfather died, on April 3 and 24, 1770 respectively, leaving Lafayette an income of 25000 livres. Upon the death of an uncle, the 12-year-old Lafayette inherited a yearly income of 120000 livres.

In May 1771, aged less than 14, Lafayette was commissioned an officer in the Musketeers, with the rank of sous-lieutenant. His duties, which included marching in military parades and presenting himself to King Louis, were mostly ceremonial and he continued his studies as usual.

At this time, Jean-Paul-François de Noailles, Duc d'Ayen was looking to marry off some of his five daughters. The young Lafayette, aged 14, seemed a good match for his 12-year-old daughter, Adrienne de La Fayette, and the duke spoke to the boy's guardian (Lafayette's uncle, the new comte) to negotiate a deal. However, the arranged marriage was opposed by Henriette Anne Louise d'Aguesseau, the duke's wife, who felt the couple, and especially her daughter, were too young. The matter was settled by agreeing not to mention the marriage plans for two years, during which time the two spouses-to-be would meet from time to time in casual settings and get to know each other better. The scheme worked; the two fell in love, and were happy together from the time of their marriage in 1774 until her death in 1807.

== Departure from France ==
=== Finding a cause ===
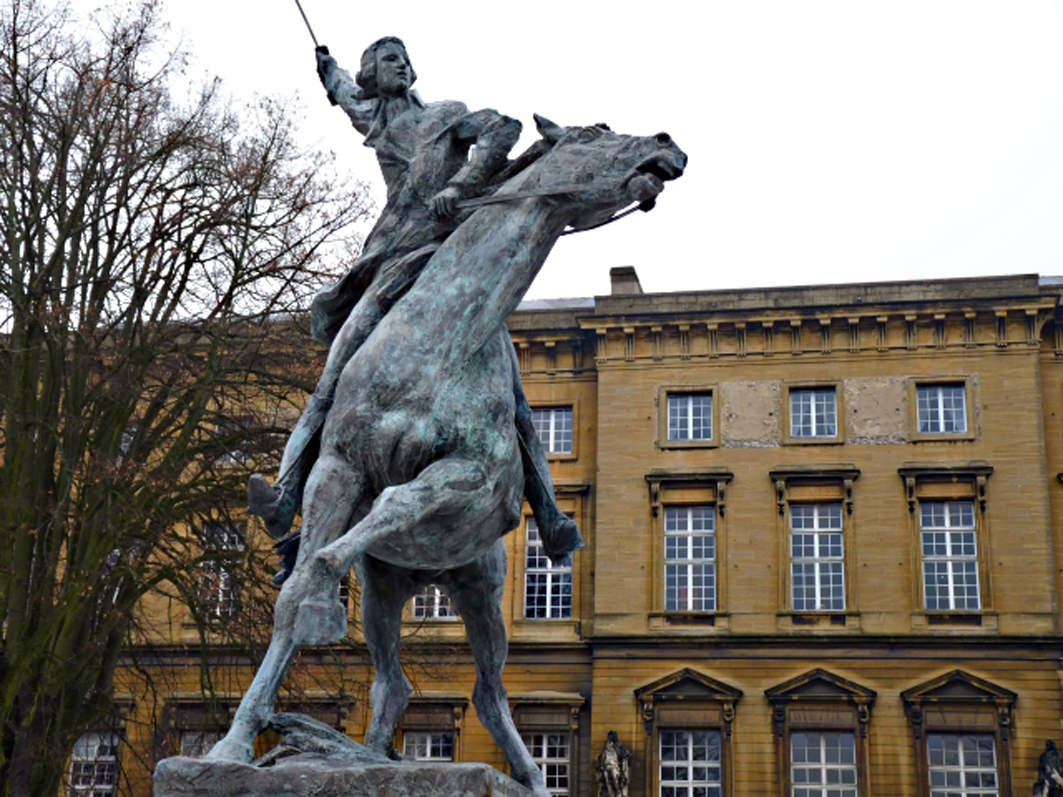
Statue of Lafayette in front of the Governor Palace in Metz, where he decided to join the American cause.

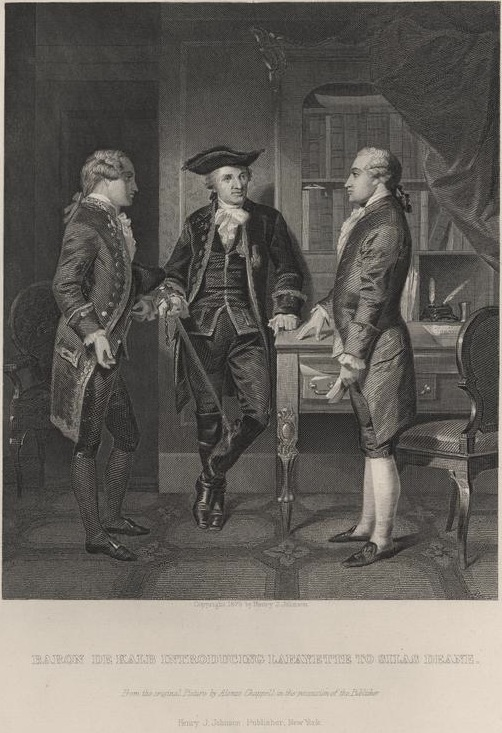
1879 Alonzo Chappel print of Lafayette (center) being introduced by Baron Johann de Kalb (left) to Silas Deane

After the marriage contract was signed in 1773, Lafayette lived with his young wife in his father-in-law's house in Versailles. He continued his education, both at the riding school of Versailles, where his fellow students included the future Charles X, and at the prestigious Académie de Versailles. He was given a commission as a lieutenant in the Noailles Dragoons in April 1773, the transfer from the royal regiment being done at the request of Lafayette's father-in-law.

In 1775, Lafayette took part in his unit's annual training in Metz, where he met Charles François de Broglie, Marquis of Ruffec, the Army of the East's commander. At dinner, both men discussed the ongoing revolt against British rule in the Thirteen Colonies. Historian Marc Leepson argued that Lafayette, "who had grown up loathing the British for killing his father", felt that an American victory in the conflict would diminish Britain's stature internationally. Another historian noted that Lafayette had recently become a Freemason, and news of the revolt fired his chivalric – and now Masonic – imagination with descriptions of Americans as "people fighting for liberty". Lafayette attended a dinner at this time with the Duke of Gloucester (brother of King George III), who complained about the American Patriots and mocked their beliefs in equality and the right of self-rule. Lafayette later recalled the dinner as a turning point in his thinking, and the time when he learned that Washington was seeking recruits for the Continental Army.

In September 1775, when Lafayette turned 18, he returned to Paris and received the captaincy in the Dragoons he had been promised as a wedding present. In December, his first child, Henriette, was born. During these months, Lafayette became convinced that the American Revolution reflected his own beliefs, saying "My heart was dedicated". The year 1776 saw delicate negotiations between American agents, including Silas Deane, and Louis XVI and his foreign minister, the Count of Vergennes. The king and his minister hoped that by supplying the Americans with arms and officers, they might restore French influence in North America, and exact revenge against Britain for France's defeat in the Seven Years' War. When Lafayette heard that French officers were being sent to America, he demanded to be among them. He met Deane and gained inclusion despite his youth. On December 7, 1776, Deane enlisted Lafayette as a major general.

The plan to send French officers (as well as other forms of aid) to the Americans came to nothing when the British government gained wind of it and threatened war. Lafayette's father-in-law, de Noailles, scolded the young man and told him to go to London and visit the Marquis de Noailles, the French ambassador to Britain and Lafayette's uncle by marriage, which he did in February 1777. In the interim, he did not abandon his plans to go to America. Lafayette was presented to George III and spent three weeks in London. On his return to France, he went into hiding from his father-in-law (and superior officer), writing to him that he was planning to go to America. De Noailles was furious and convinced Louis to issue a decree forbidding French officers from serving in America, specifically naming Lafayette. Vergennes may have persuaded the king to order Lafayette's arrest, though this is uncertain.

=== Departure for America ===
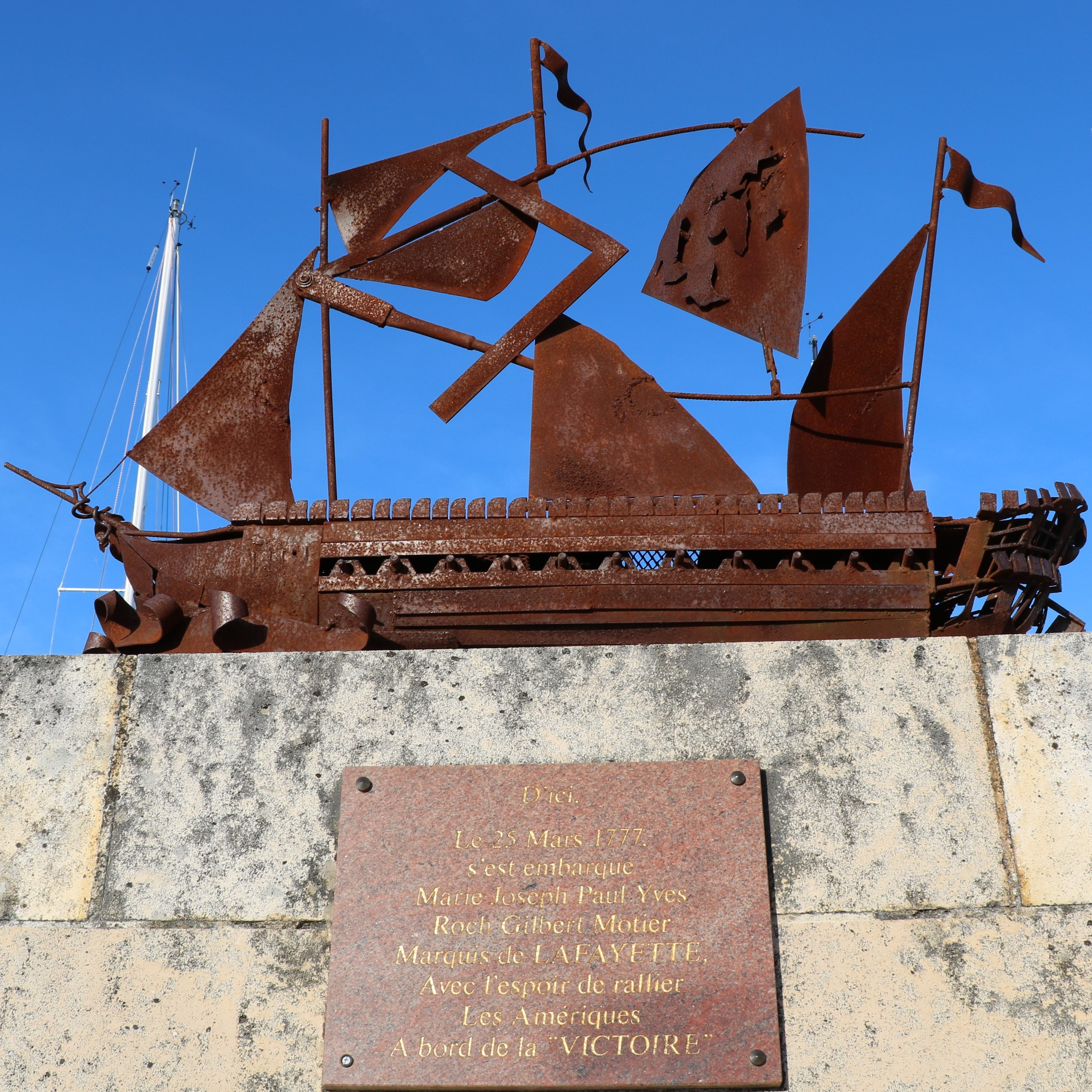
Plaza Lafayette in Pauillac, where Victoire set sail to Pasaia on March 25, 1777

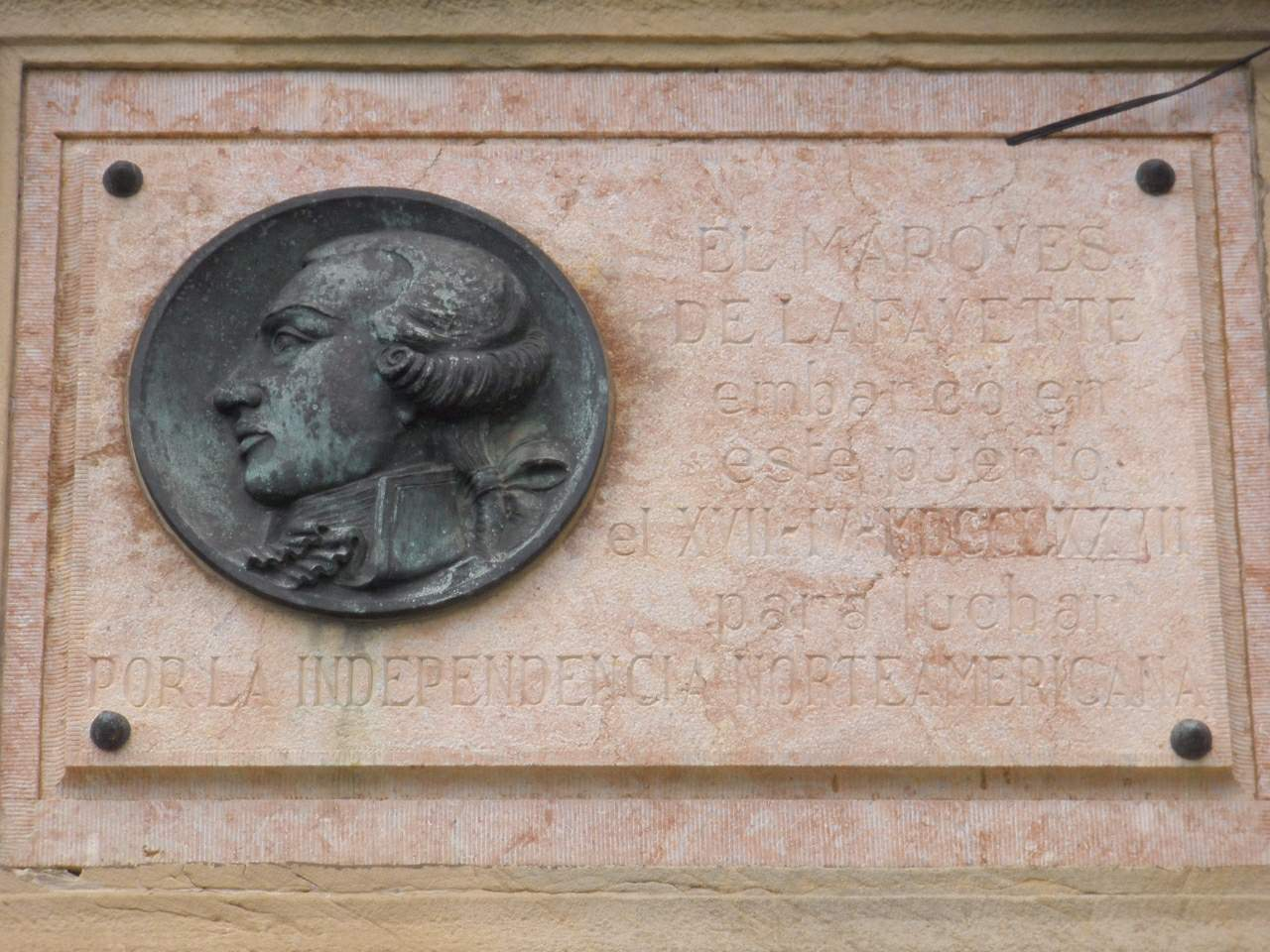
Plaque at Pasaia in the Basque Country, Spain commemorating La Fayette's departure in 1777

Lafayette learned that the Continental Congress lacked funds for his voyage, so he bought the sailing ship Victoire with his own money for 112,000 pounds. He journeyed to Bordeaux, where Victoire was being prepared for her trip, and he sent word asking for information on his family's reaction. The response threw him into emotional turmoil, including letters from his wife and other relatives. Soon after departure, he ordered the ship turned around and returned to Bordeaux, to the frustration of the officers traveling with him. The army commander there ordered Lafayette to report to his father-in-law's regiment in Marseille. De Broglie hoped to become a military and political leader in America, and he met Lafayette in Bordeaux and convinced him that the government actually wanted him to go. This was not true, though there was considerable public support for Lafayette in Paris, where the American cause was popular. Lafayette wanted to believe it and pretended to comply with the order to report to Marseilles, going only a few kilometres east before turning around and returning to his ship. Victoire set sail out of Pauillac on the shores of the Gironde on March 25, 1777. However, Lafayette was not on board in order to avoid being identified by British spies or the French Crown; the vessel moored in Pasaia on the Basque coast and was supplied with 5,000 rifles and ammunition from the factories in Gipuzkoa. He joined the Victoire, departing to America on April 26, 1777. The two-month journey to the New World was marked by seasickness and boredom. The ship's captain Lebourcier intended to stop in the West Indies to sell cargo, but Lafayette was fearful of arrest, so he bought the cargo to avoid docking at the islands. He landed on North Island near Georgetown, South Carolina on June 13, 1777.

== American Revolution ==
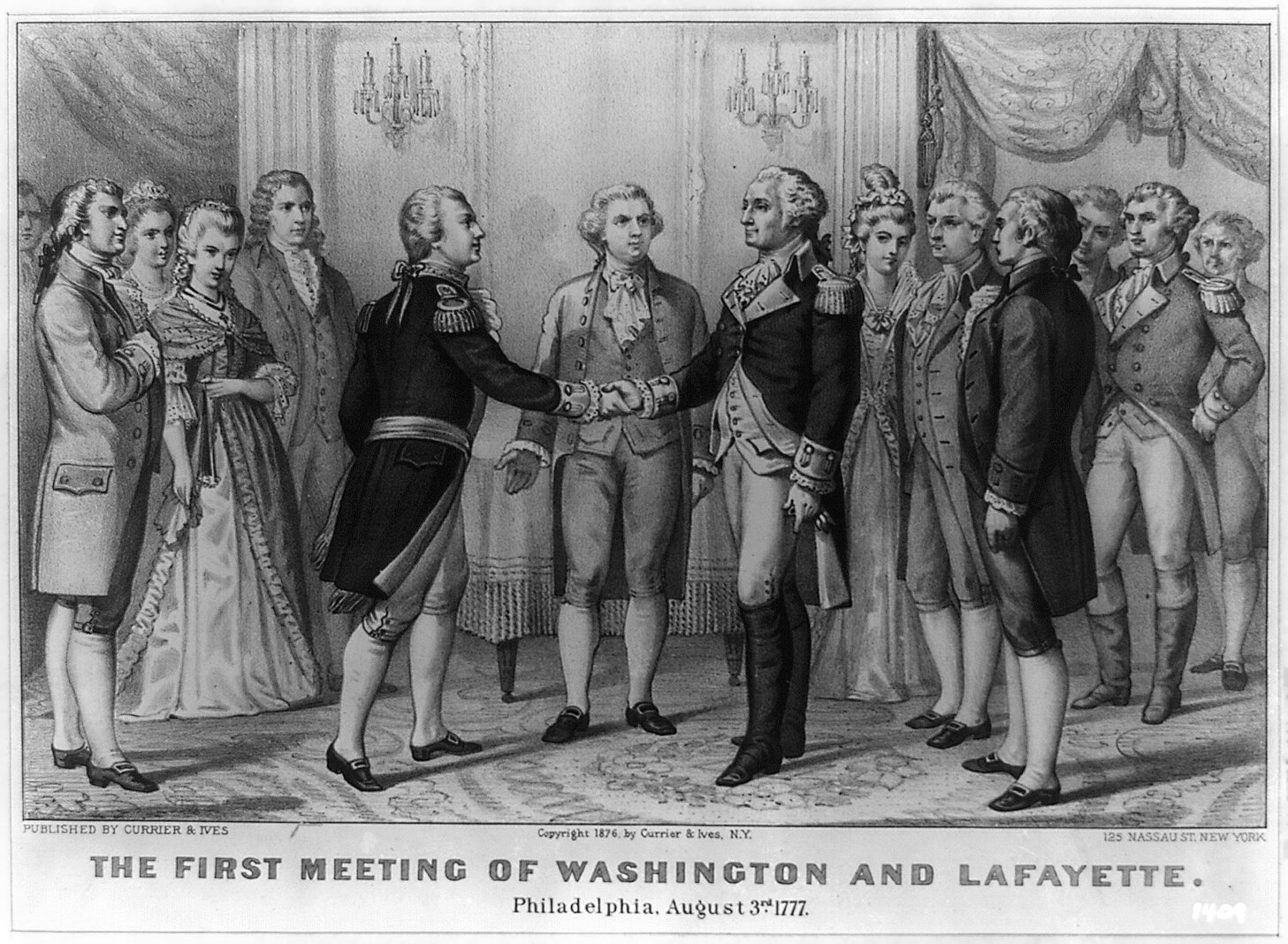
An illustration of the Marquis de Lafayette first meeting George Washington on August 5, 1777, by Currier and Ives

Upon his arrival, Lafayette met Major Benjamin Huger, a wealthy landowner, and stayed with him for two weeks before departing for the revolutionary capital of Philadelphia. The Second Continental Congress, convened in Philadelphia, had been overwhelmed by French officers recruited by Deane, many of whom could not speak English or lacked military experience. Lafayette had learned some English en route and became fluent within a year of his arrival, and his Masonic membership opened many doors in Philadelphia. After Lafayette offered to serve without pay, Congress commissioned him a major general on July 31, 1777. Lafayette's advocates included the recently arrived American envoy to France, Benjamin Franklin, who by letter urged Congress to accommodate the young Frenchman.

General George Washington, commander in chief of the Continental Army, came to Philadelphia to brief Congress on military affairs. Lafayette met him at a dinner on August 5, 1777; according to Leepson, "the two men bonded almost immediately." Washington was impressed by the young man's enthusiasm and was inclined to think well of a fellow Mason; Lafayette was simply in awe of the commanding general. General Washington took the Frenchman to view his military camp; when Washington expressed embarrassment at its state and that of the troops, Lafayette responded, "I am here to learn, not to teach." He became a member of Washington's staff, although confusion existed regarding his status. Congress regarded his commission as honorary, while he considered himself a full-fledged commander who would be given control of a division when Washington deemed him prepared. Washington told Lafayette that a division would not be possible as he was of foreign birth, but that he would be happy to hold him in confidence as "friend and father".

=== Brandywine, Valley Forge, and Albany ===
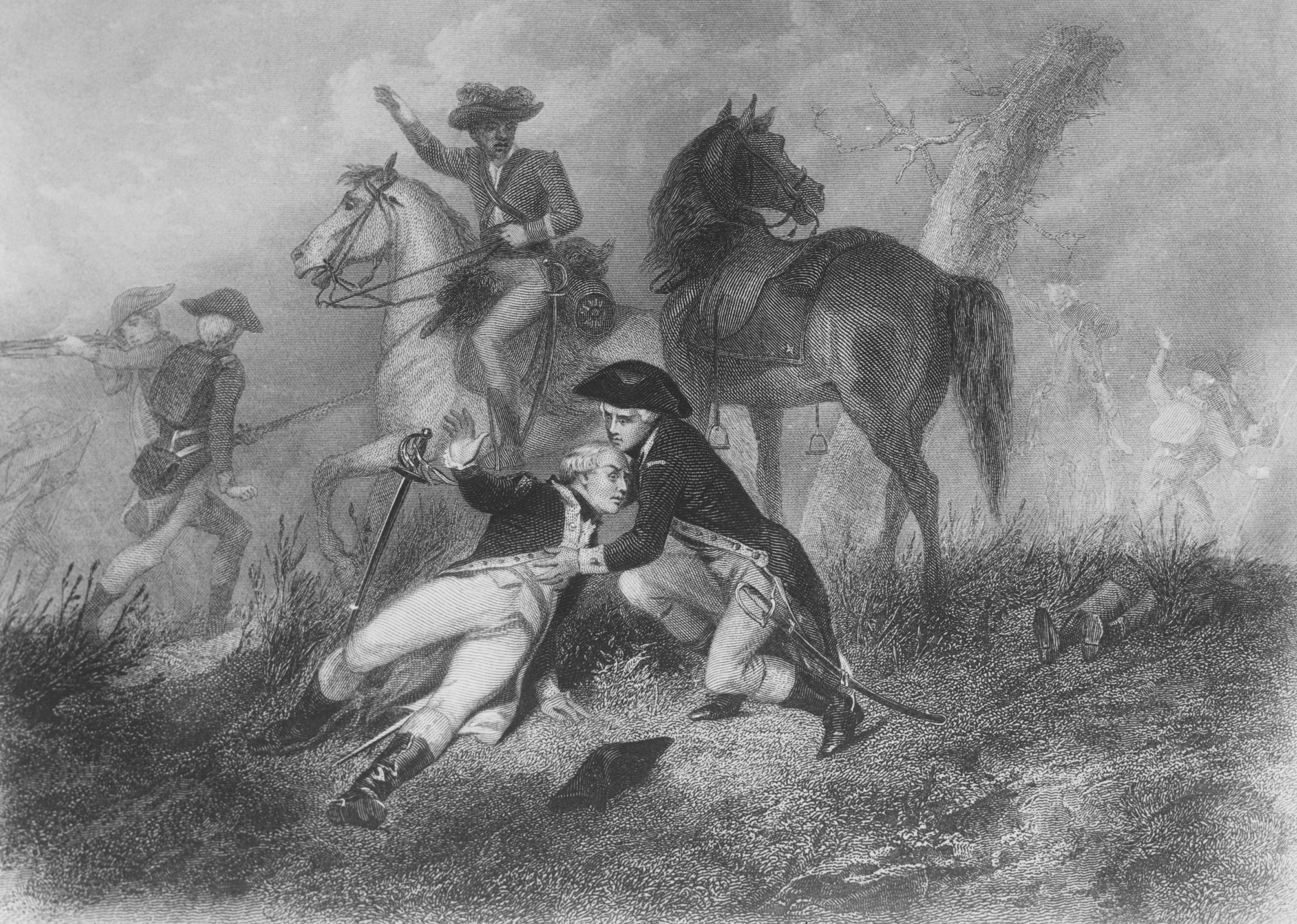
Lafayette wounded at the Battle of Brandywine.

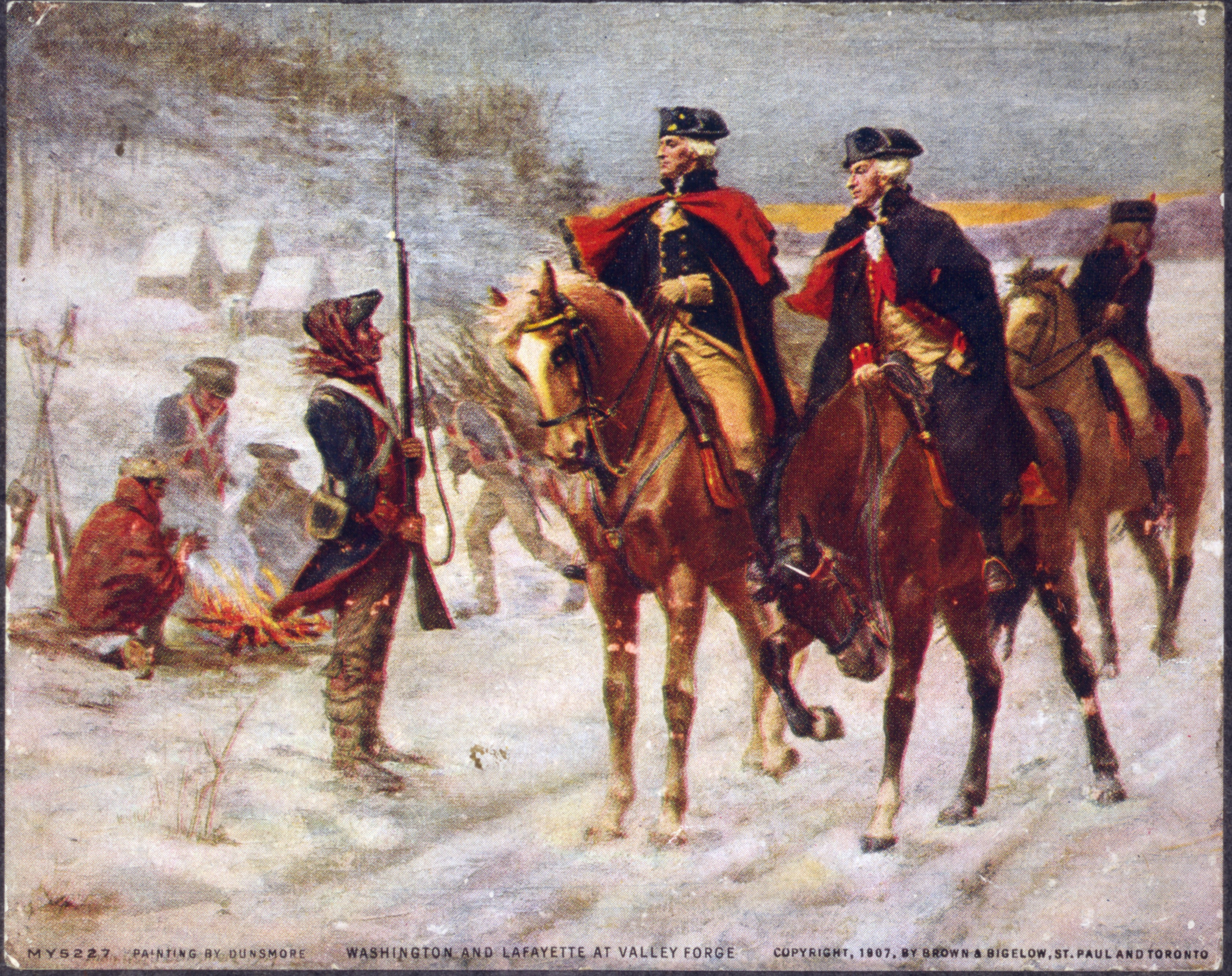
John Ward Dunsmore's 1907 depiction of Lafayette (right) and Washington at Valley Forge

Lafayette first saw combat at the Battle of Brandywine near Chadds Ford, Pennsylvania, on September 11, 1777. British commander Sir William Howe made plans to occupy Philadelphia by moving troops south by ship to Chesapeake Bay rather than approaching the city through the Delaware Bay, which there was a heavy Continental Army presence, and then bringing British troops over land to the city. After the British outflanked the Americans, Washington sent Lafayette to join General John Sullivan. Upon his arrival, Lafayette went with the Third Pennsylvania Brigade, under Brigadier Thomas Conway, and attempted to rally the unit to face the attack. British and Hessian troops continued to advance with their superior numbers, and Lafayette was shot in the leg. During the American retreat, Lafayette rallied the troops, allowing a more orderly pullback, before being treated for his wound. After the battle, Washington cited him for "bravery and military ardour" and recommended him for the command of a division in a letter to Congress, which was hastily evacuating, as the British occupied Philadelphia later that month.

Lafayette returned to the field in November after two months of recuperation in the Moravian settlement of Bethlehem, and received command of the division previously led by Major General Adam Stephen. He assisted General Nathanael Greene in reconnaissance of British positions in New Jersey; with 300 soldiers, he defeated a numerically superior Hessian force in Gloucester, on November 24, 1777.

Lafayette stayed at Washington's encampment at Valley Forge in the winter of 1777–1778, and shared the hardship of his troops. There, the Board of War, led by Horatio Gates, asked Lafayette to prepare an invasion of Quebec from Albany, New York. When Lafayette arrived in Albany, he found too few men to mount an invasion. He wrote to Washington of the situation, and made plans to return to Valley Forge. Before departing, he recruited the Oneida tribe to the American side. The Oneida referred to Lafayette as Kayewla (fearsome horseman). In Valley Forge, he criticized the board's decision to attempt an invasion of Quebec in winter. The Continental Congress agreed, and Gates left the board. Meanwhile, treaties signed by America and France were made public in March 1778, and France formally recognized American independence.

=== Barren Hill, Monmouth, and Rhode Island ===
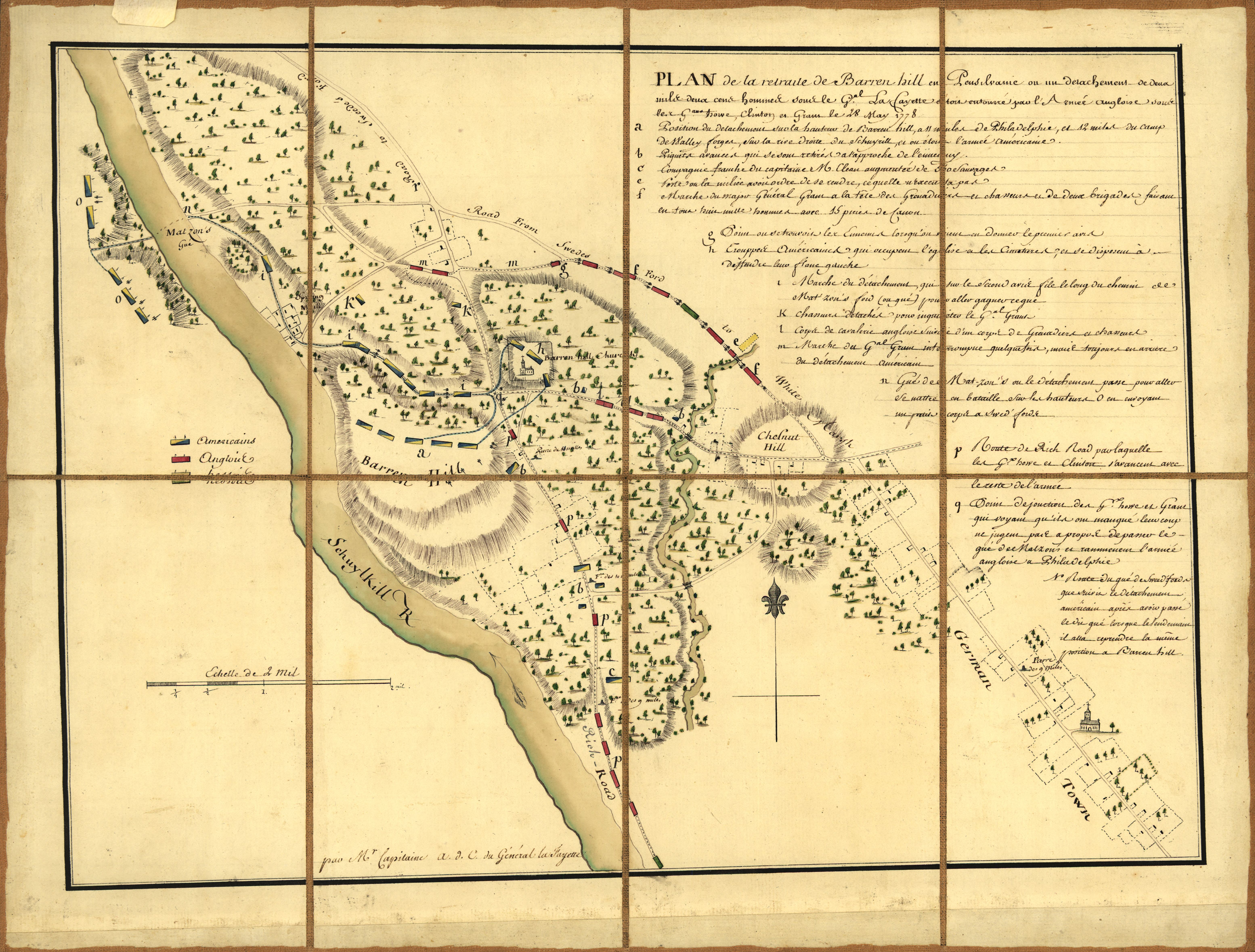
Map of the Battle of Barren Hill by Michel Capitaine du Chesnoy, aide-de-camp to Lafayette

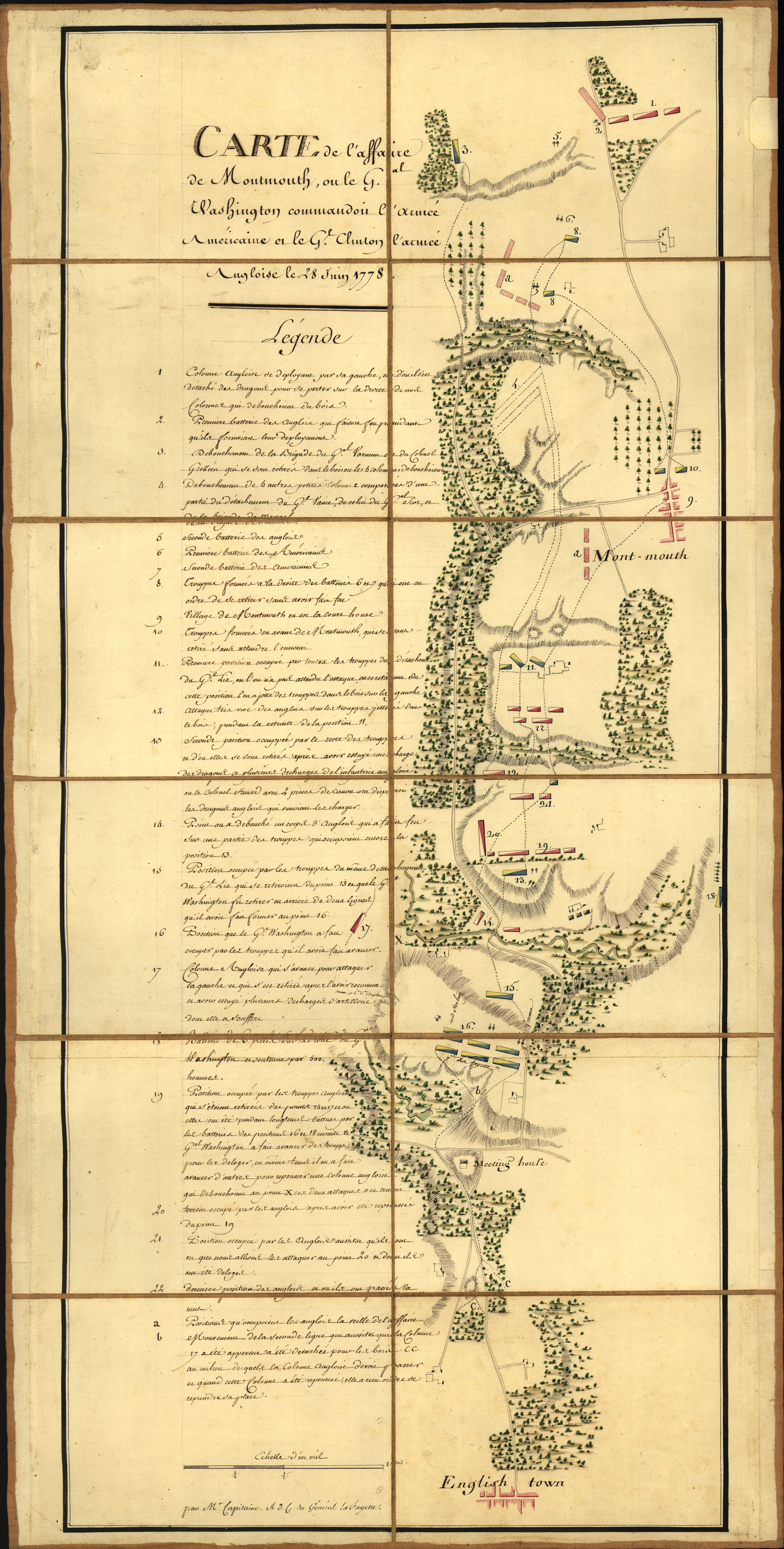
Map of the Battle of Monmouth by Michel Capitaine du Chesnoy, aide-de-camp to Lafayette

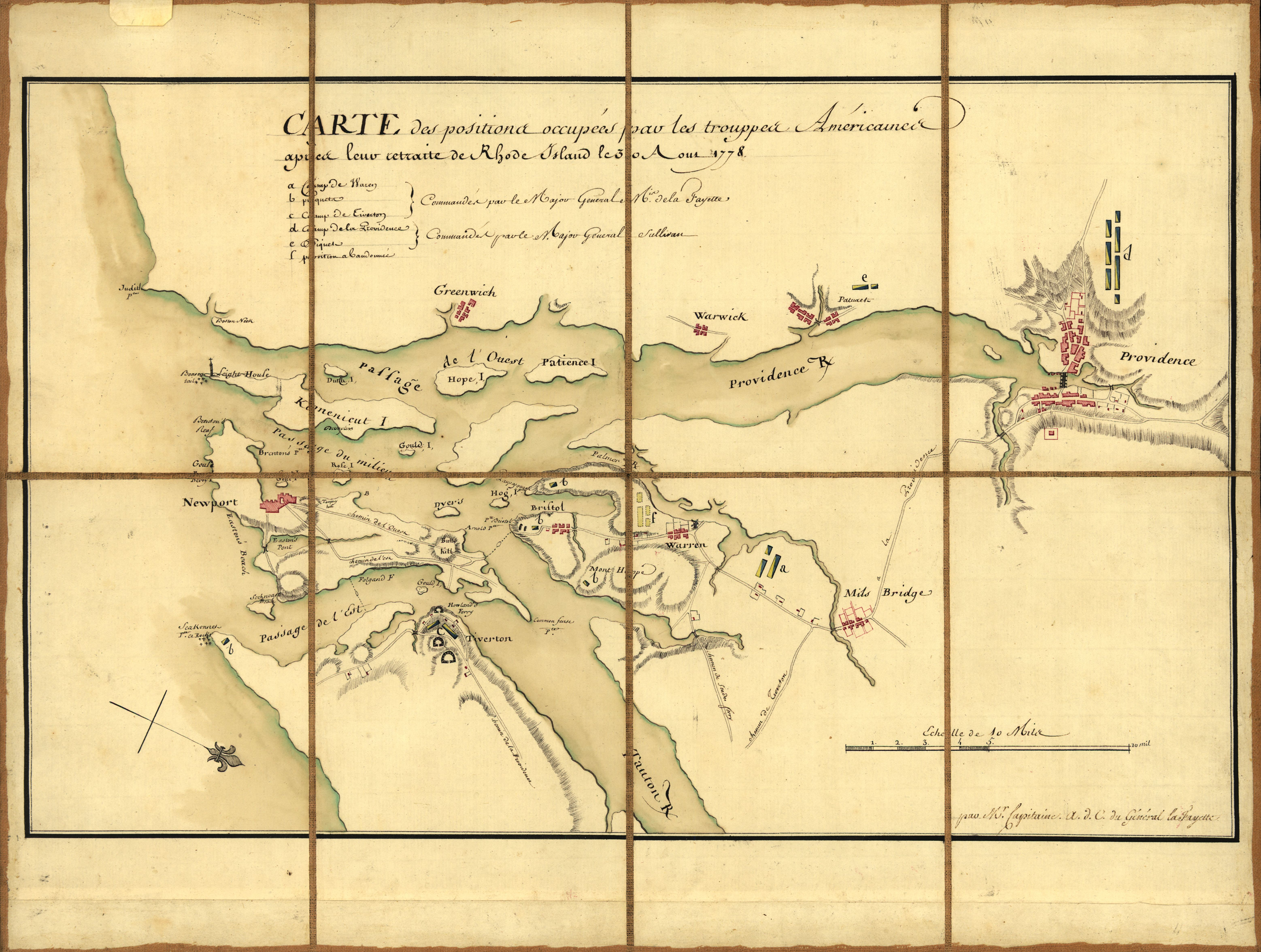
A 1778 French military map showing the positions of generals Lafayette and Sullivan around Narragansett Bay on August 30.

Faced with the prospect of French intervention, the British sought to concentrate their land and naval forces in New York City, and they began to evacuate Philadelphia in May 1778. Washington dispatched Lafayette with a 2200-man force on May 18 to reconnoiter near Barren Hill, Pennsylvania. The next day, the British heard that he had made camp nearby and sent 5000 men to capture him. General Howe led a further 6000 soldiers on May 20 and ordered an attack on his left flank. The flank scattered, and Lafayette organized a retreat while the British remained indecisive. To feign numerical superiority, Lafayette ordered men to appear from the woods on an outcropping (now Lafayette Hill, Pennsylvania) and to fire upon the British periodically. His troops simultaneously escaped via a sunken road, and he was then able to cross Matson's Ford with the remainder of his force.

The British then marched from Philadelphia toward New York. The Continental Army followed and finally attacked at Monmouth Courthouse in central New Jersey. Washington appointed General Charles Lee to lead the attacking force at the Battle of Monmouth, and Lee moved against the British flank on June 28, 1778. However, he gave conflicting orders soon after fighting began, causing chaos in the American ranks. Lafayette sent a message to Washington to urge him to the front; upon his arrival, he found Lee's men in retreat. Washington relieved Lee, took command, and rallied the American force. After suffering significant casualties at Monmouth, the British withdrew in the night and successfully reached New York.

The French fleet arrived at Delaware Bay on July 8, 1778, under Admiral Charles Henri Hector, Count of Estaing, with whom Washington planned to attack Newport, Rhode Island, the other major British base in the north. Lafayette and Greene were sent with a 3000-man force to participate in the attack. Lafayette wanted to control a joint Franco-American force but was rebuffed by the admiral. On August 9, the American land force attacked the British without consulting Estaing. The Americans asked Estaing to place his ships in Narragansett Bay, but he refused and sought to defeat the British Royal Navy at sea. The fighting was inconclusive as a storm scattered and damaged both fleets.

Estaing moved his ships north to Boston for repairs, where it faced an angry demonstration from Bostonians who considered the French departure from Newport to be a desertion. John Hancock and Lafayette were dispatched to calm the situation, and Lafayette then returned to Rhode Island to prepare the retreat made necessary by Estaing's departure. For these actions, he was cited by the Continental Congress for "gallantry, skill, and prudence". He wanted to expand the war to fight the British elsewhere in America and even in Europe under the French flag, but he found little interest in his proposals. In October 1778, he requested permission from Washington and Congress to go home on leave. They agreed, with Congress voting to give him a ceremonial sword to be presented to him in France. His departure was delayed by illness, and he sailed for France in January 1779.

=== Return to France ===
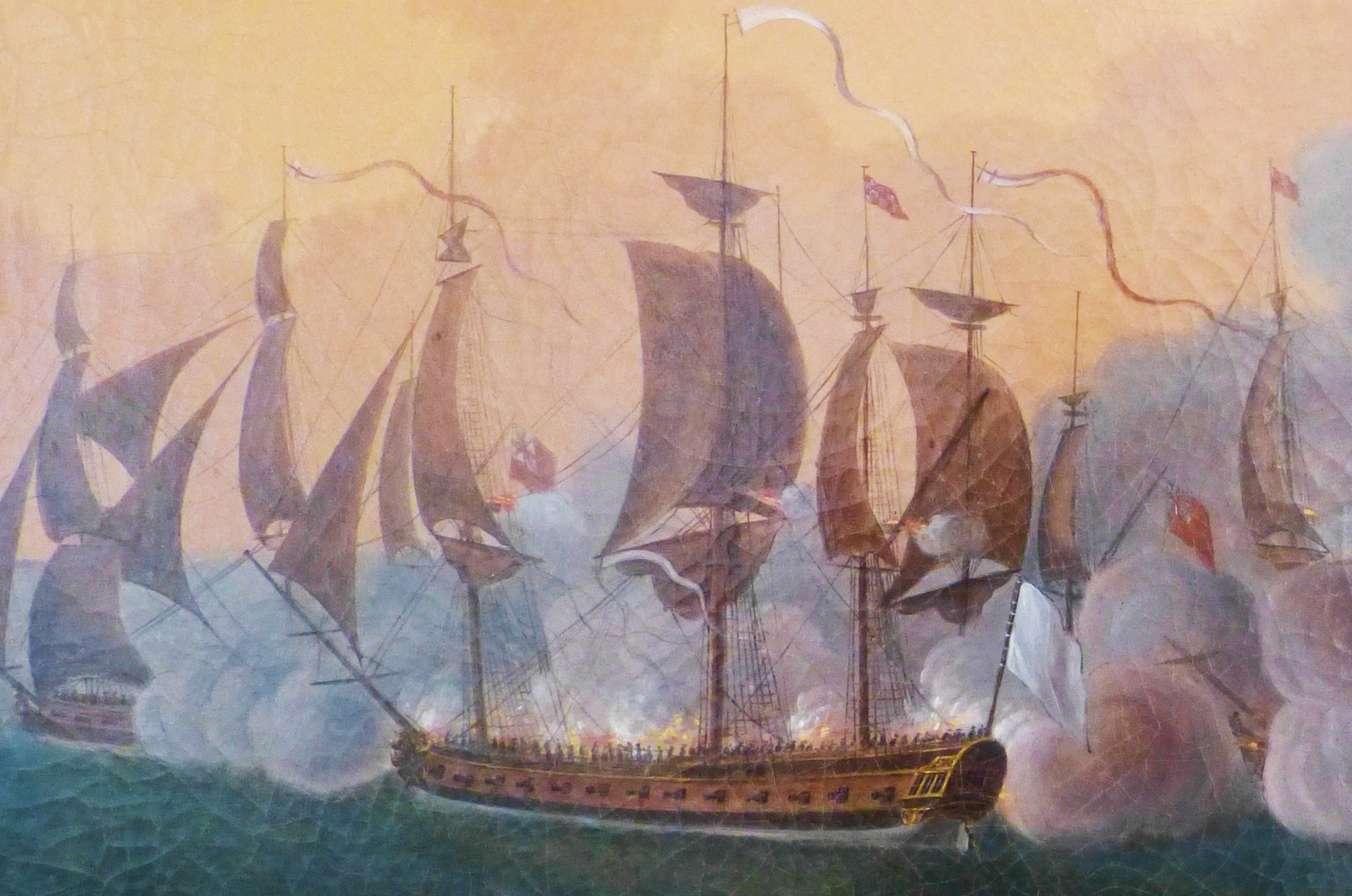
The frigate Hermione, which brought Lafayette to America in 1780

Lafayette reached Paris in February 1779 where he was placed under house arrest for eight days for disobeying the king by going to America. This was merely face-saving by Louis XVI; Lafayette was given a hero's welcome and was soon invited to hunt with the king. The American envoy was ill, so Benjamin Franklin's grandson William Temple Franklin presented Lafayette with the gold-encrusted sword commissioned by the Continental Congress.

Lafayette pushed for an invasion of Britain, with himself to have a major command in the French forces. Spain was now France's ally against Britain and sent ships to the English Channel in support. The Spanish ships did not arrive until August 1779 and were met by a faster squadron of British ships that the combined French and Spanish fleet could not catch. In September, the invasion was abandoned, and Lafayette turned his hopes toward returning to America. In December 1779, Adrienne gave birth to Georges Washington Lafayette.

Lafayette worked with Benjamin Franklin to secure the promise of 6000 soldiers to be sent to America, commanded by General Jean-Baptiste de Rochambeau. Lafayette would resume his position as a major general of American forces, serving as liaison between Rochambeau and Washington, who would be in command of both nations' forces. In March 1780, he departed from Rochefort for America aboard the frigate Hermione, arriving in Boston on April 27, 1780.

=== Second voyage to America ===
On his return, Lafayette found the American cause at a low ebb, rocked by several military defeats, especially in the south. Lafayette was greeted in Boston with enthusiasm, seen as "a knight in shining armor from the chivalric past, come to save the nation". He journeyed southwest and on May 10, 1780, had a joyous reunion with Washington at Morristown, New Jersey. The general and his officers were delighted to hear that the large French force promised to Lafayette would be coming to their aid. Washington, aware of Lafayette's popularity, had him write (with Alexander Hamilton to correct his spelling) to state officials to urge them to provide more troops and provisions to the Continental Army. This bore fruit in the coming months, as Lafayette awaited the arrival of the French fleet. However, when the fleet arrived, there were fewer men and supplies than expected, and Rochambeau decided to wait for reinforcements before seeking battle with the British. This was unsatisfactory to Lafayette, who proposed grandiose schemes for the taking of New York City and other areas, and Rochambeau briefly refused to receive Lafayette until the young man apologized. Washington counseled the marquis to be patient.

That summer Washington placed Lafayette in charge of a division of troops. The marquis spent lavishly on his command, which patrolled North Jersey and adjacent New York state. Lafayette saw no significant action, and in November, Washington disbanded the division, sending the soldiers back to their state regiments. The war continued badly for the Americans, with most battles in the south going against them, and General Benedict Arnold abandoning them for the British side. Lafayette spent the first part of the winter of 1780–1781 in Philadelphia, where the American Philosophical Society elected him its first foreign member. Congress asked him to return to France to lobby for more men and supplies, but Lafayette refused, sending letters instead.

After the Continental victory at the Battle of Cowpens in the Province of South Carolina, in January 1781, Washington ordered Lafayette to re-form his force in Philadelphia and go south to the Colony of Virginia to link up with troops commanded by Baron von Steuben. The combined force was to try to trap British forces commanded by Benedict Arnold, with French ships preventing his escape by sea. If Lafayette was successful, Arnold was to be summarily hanged. British command of the seas prevented the plan, though Lafayette and a small part of his force was able to reach von Steuben in Yorktown, Virginia. Von Steuben sent a plan to Washington, proposing to use land forces and French ships to trap the main British force under Lord Cornwallis. When he received no new orders from Washington, Lafayette began to move his troops north toward Philadelphia, only to be ordered to Virginia to assume military command there. An outraged Lafayette assumed he was being abandoned in a backwater while decisive battles took place elsewhere, and objected to his orders in vain. He also sent letters to the Chevalier de la Luzerne, French ambassador in Philadelphia, describing how ill-supplied his troops were. As Lafayette hoped, la Luzerne sent his letter on to France with a recommendation of massive French aid, which, after being approved by the king, would play a crucial part in the battles to come. Washington, fearing a letter might be captured by the British, could not tell Lafayette that he planned to trap Cornwallis in a decisive campaign.

=== Virginia and Yorktown ===
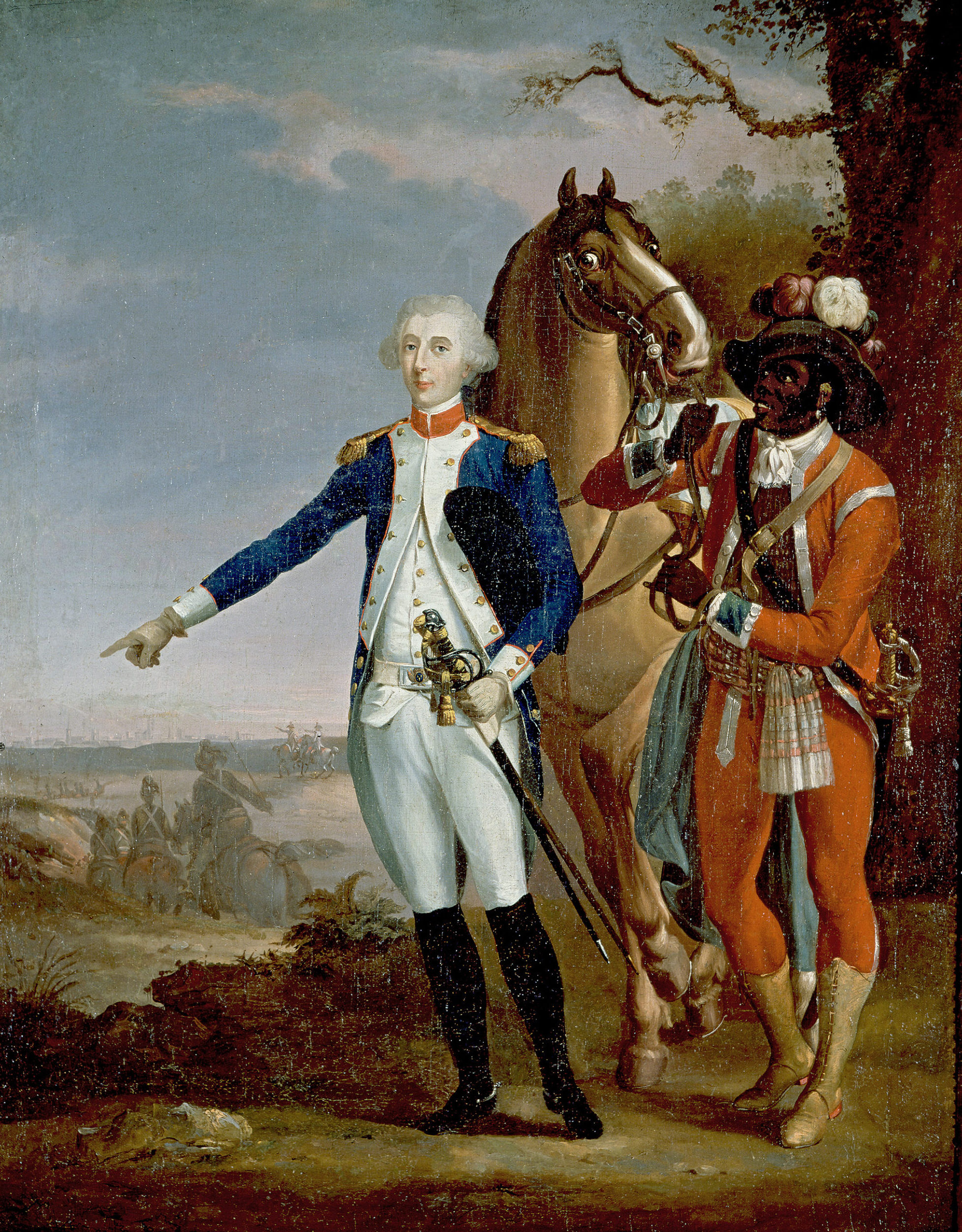
Lafayette at Yorktown (Jean-Baptiste Le Paon, c. 1783–1785)

Lafayette evaded Cornwallis' attempts to capture him in Richmond. In June 1781, Cornwallis received orders from London to proceed to the Chesapeake Bay and to oversee construction of a port, in preparation for an overland attack on Philadelphia. As the British column traveled, Lafayette sent small squads that would appear unexpectedly, attacking the rearguard or foraging parties, and giving the impression that his forces were larger than they were.

On July 4, the British left Williamsburg and prepared to cross the James River. Cornwallis sent only an advance guard to the south side of the river, hiding many of his other troops in the forest on the north side, hoping to ambush Lafayette. On July 6, Lafayette ordered General "Mad" Anthony Wayne to strike British troops on the north side with roughly 800 soldiers. Wayne found himself vastly outnumbered, and, instead of retreating, led a bayonet charge. The charge bought time for the Americans, and the British did not pursue. The Battle of Green Spring was a victory for Cornwallis, but the American army was bolstered by the display of courage by the men.

By August, Cornwallis had established the British at Yorktown, and Lafayette took up position on Malvern Hill, stationing artillery surrounding the British, who were close to the York River, and who had orders to construct fortifications to protect the British ships in Hampton Roads. Lafayette's containment trapped the British when the French fleet arrived and won the Battle of the Virginia Capes, depriving Cornwallis of naval protection. On September 14, 1781, Washington's forces joined Lafayette's. On September 28, with the French fleet blockading the British, the combined forces laid siege to Yorktown. On October 14, Lafayette's 400 men on the American right took Redoubt 9 after Alexander Hamilton's forces had charged Redoubt 10 in hand-to-hand combat. These two redoubts were key to breaking the British defenses. After a failed British counter-attack, Cornwallis surrendered on October 19, 1781.

== Hero of two worlds ==
Yorktown was the last major land battle of the American Revolution, but the British still held several major port cities. Lafayette wanted to lead expeditions to capture them, but Washington felt that he would be more useful seeking additional naval support from France. Congress appointed him its advisor to America's envoys in Europe, Benjamin Franklin in Paris, John Jay in Madrid, and John Adams in The Hague, instructing them "to communicate and agree on everything with him". Congress also sent Louis XVI an official letter of commendation on the Marquis's behalf.

Lafayette left Boston for France on December 18, 1781, where he was welcomed as a hero, and he was received at the Palace of Versailles on January 22, 1782. He witnessed the birth of his daughter, whom he named Marie-Antoinette Virginie upon Thomas Jefferson's recommendation. He was promoted to maréchal de camp, skipping numerous ranks, and he was made a Knight of the Order of Saint Louis. He worked on a combined French and Spanish expedition against the British West Indies in 1782, as no formal peace treaty had yet been signed. The Treaty of Paris was signed between Great Britain and the United States in 1783, which made the expedition unnecessary; Lafayette took part in those negotiations.

Lafayette worked with Jefferson to establish trade agreements between the United States and France which aimed to reduce America's debt to France. He joined the Society of the Friends of the Blacks, a French abolitionist group which advocated for abolishing France's involvement in the Atlantic slave trade and equal rights for free people of color in France and its colonies. Lafayette urged the emancipation of American slaves and their establishment as tenant farmers in a 1783 letter to Washington, who was a slave owner. Washington declined to free his slaves, though he expressed interest in the young man's ideas, and Lafayette purchased a slave plantation in the French colony of Cayenne to house the project.

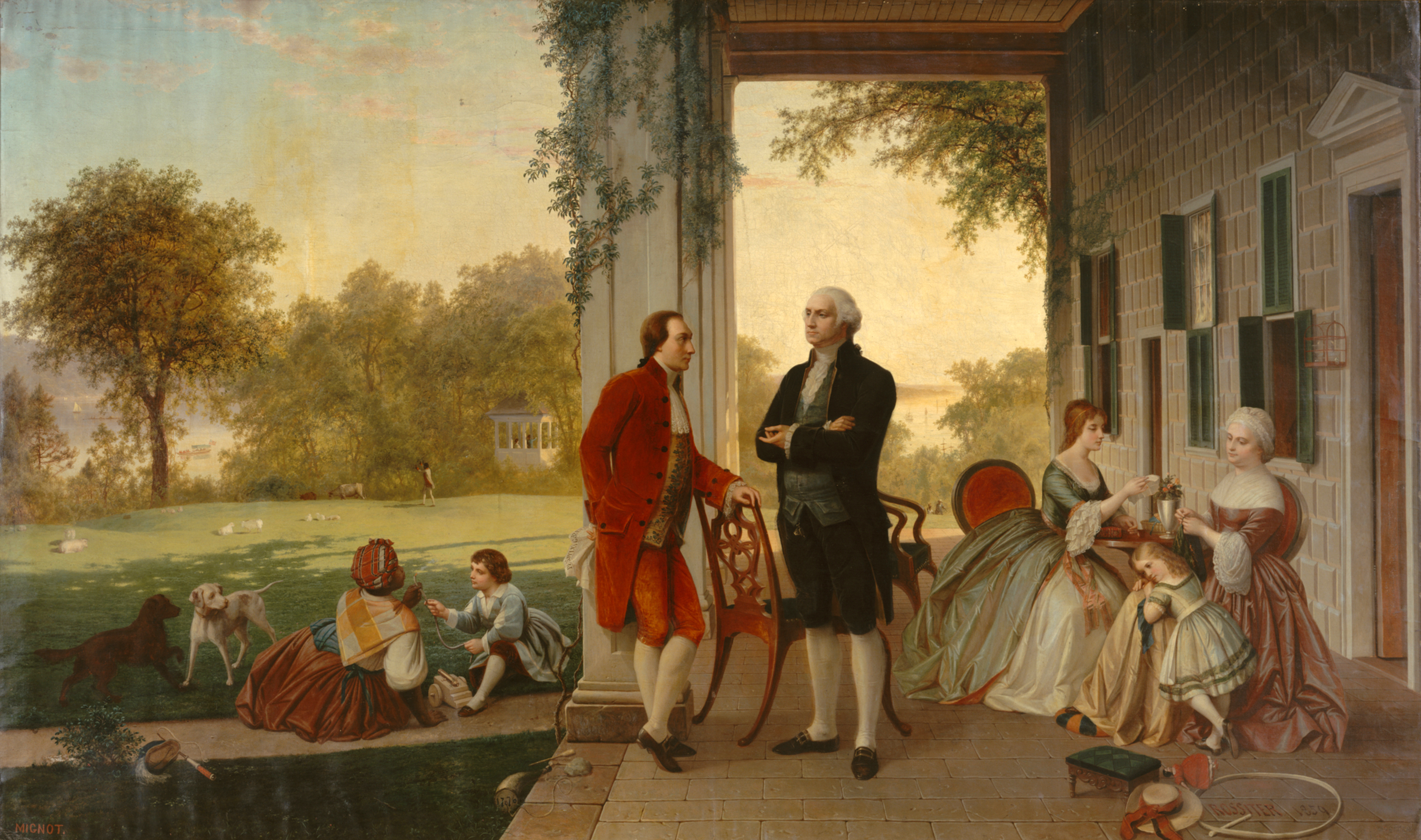
Lafayette and Washington at Mount Vernon, 1784 (Thomas Prichard Rossiter and Louis Rémy Mignot, 1859)

Lafayette visited America from 1784 to 1785 where he enjoyed an enthusiastic welcome, visiting all the states. The trip included a visit to Washington's farm at Mount Vernon on August 17. He addressed the Virginia House of Delegates where he called for "liberty of all mankind" and urged the abolition of slavery, and he urged the Pennsylvania Legislature to help form a federal union (the states were then bound by the Articles of Confederation). He visited the Mohawk Valley in New York to participate in peace negotiations with the Haudenosaunee, some of whom he had met in 1778. He received an honorary degree from Harvard University, a portrait of Washington from the city of Boston, and a bust from the state of Virginia. Maryland's legislature honored him by making him and his male heirs "natural born Citizens" of the state, which made him a natural-born citizen of the United States after the 1789 ratification of the Constitution. (Note: The New York Times article contained a facsimile and transcript of the Maryland Act: "An Act to naturalize Major General the Marquis de la Fayette and his Heirs Male Forever. ... Be it enacted by the General Assembly of Maryland – that the Marquis de la Fayette and his Heirs male forever shall be and they and each of them are hereby deemed adjudged and taken to be natural born Citizens of this State and shall henceforth be instilled to all the Immunities, Rights and Privileges of natural born Citizens thereof, they and every one of them conforming to the Constitution and Laws of this State in the Enjoyment and Exercise of such Immunities, Rights and Privileges.")

Lafayette later boasted that he had become an American citizen before the concept of French citizenship existed. Connecticut, Massachusetts, and Virginia also granted him citizenship. Lafayette made the Hôtel de La Fayette in Paris's rue de Bourbon an important meeting place for Americans there. Benjamin Franklin, John and Sarah Jay, and John and Abigail Adams met there every Monday and dined in company with Lafayette's family and the liberal nobility, including Clermont-Tonnerre and Madame de Staël. Lafayette continued to work on lowering trade barriers in France to American goods, and on assisting Franklin and Jefferson in seeking treaties of amity and commerce with European nations. He also sought to correct the injustices that Huguenots in France had endured since the revocation of the Edict of Nantes a century before.

== French Revolution ==
=== Assembly of Notables and Estates-General ===
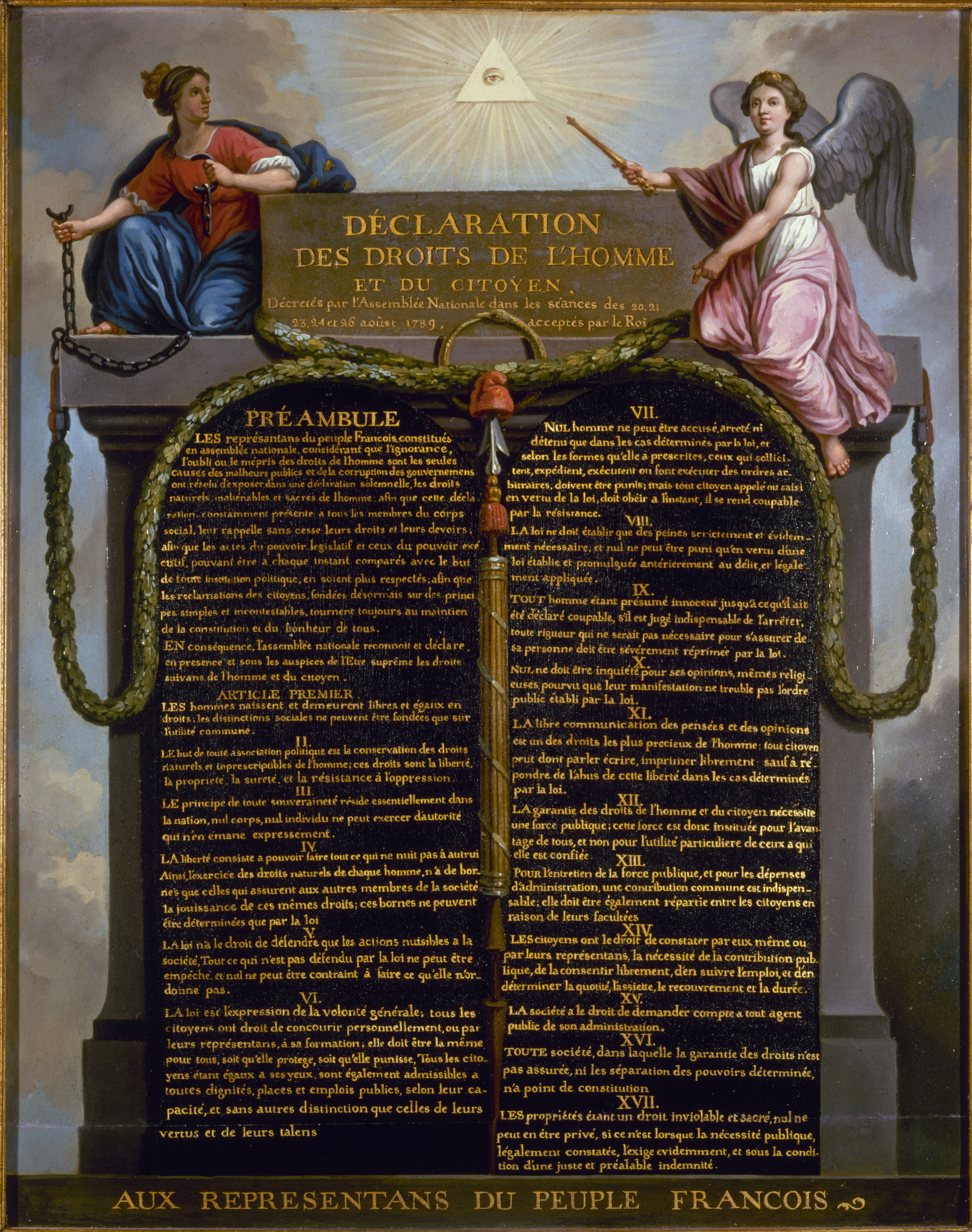
"Declaration of the Rights of Man and of the Citizen", proposed to the Estates-General by Lafayette.

On December 29, 1786, King Louis XVI called an Assembly of Notables, in response to France's fiscal crisis. The king appointed Lafayette to the body, which convened on February 22, 1787. In speeches, Lafayette decried those with connections at court who had profited from advance knowledge of government land purchases; he advocated reform. He called for a "truly national assembly", which represented the whole of France. Instead, the king chose to summon an Estates General, to convene in 1789. Lafayette was elected as a representative of the nobility (the Second Estate) from Riom. The Estates General, traditionally, cast one vote for each of the three Estates: clergy, nobility, and commons, meaning the much larger commons was generally outvoted.

The Estates General convened on May 5, 1789; debate began on whether the delegates should vote by head or by Estate. If by Estate, then the nobility and clergy would be able to outvote the commons; if by head, then the larger Third Estate could dominate. Before the meeting, as a member of the "Committee of Thirty", Lafayette agitated for voting by head, rather than estate. He could not get a majority of his own Estate to agree, but the clergy was willing to join with the commons, and on May 17, the group declared itself the National Assembly. The loyalist response was to lock out the group, including Lafayette, while those who had not supported the Assembly met inside. This action led to the Tennis Court Oath, where the excluded members swore not to separate until a constitution was established. The Assembly continued to meet, and on July 11, 1789, Lafayette presented a draft of the "Declaration of the Rights of Man and of the Citizen" to the Assembly, written by himself in consultation with Jefferson. The next day, after the dismissal of Finance Minister Jacques Necker (who was seen as a reformer), lawyer Camille Desmoulins assembled between 700 and 1000 armed insurgents. The king had the royal army under the duc de Broglie surround Paris. On July 14, the fortress known as the Bastille was stormed by the insurgents.

=== National Guard, Versailles, and Day of Daggers ===
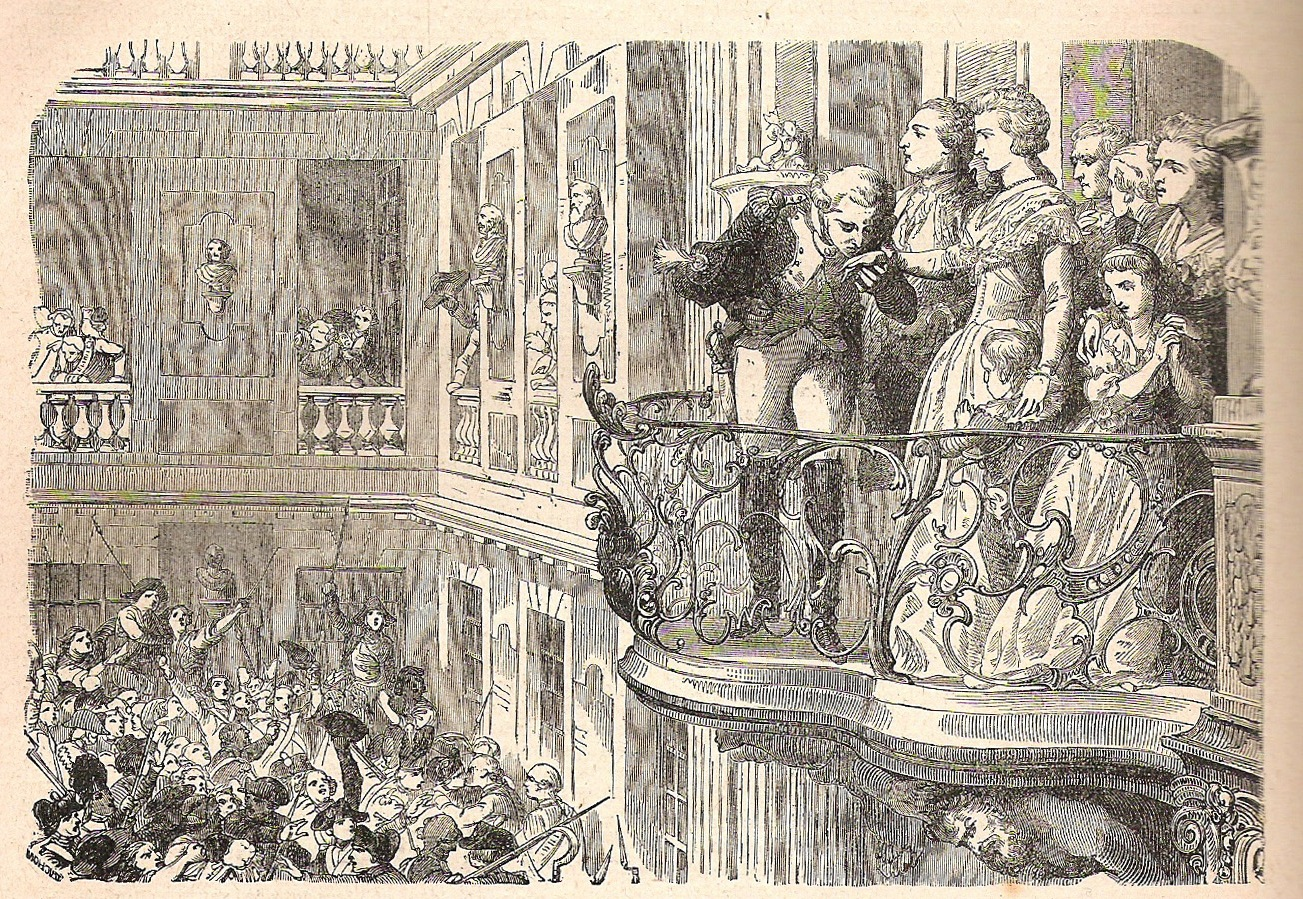
Lafayette at the balcony of Versailles with Marie Antoinette

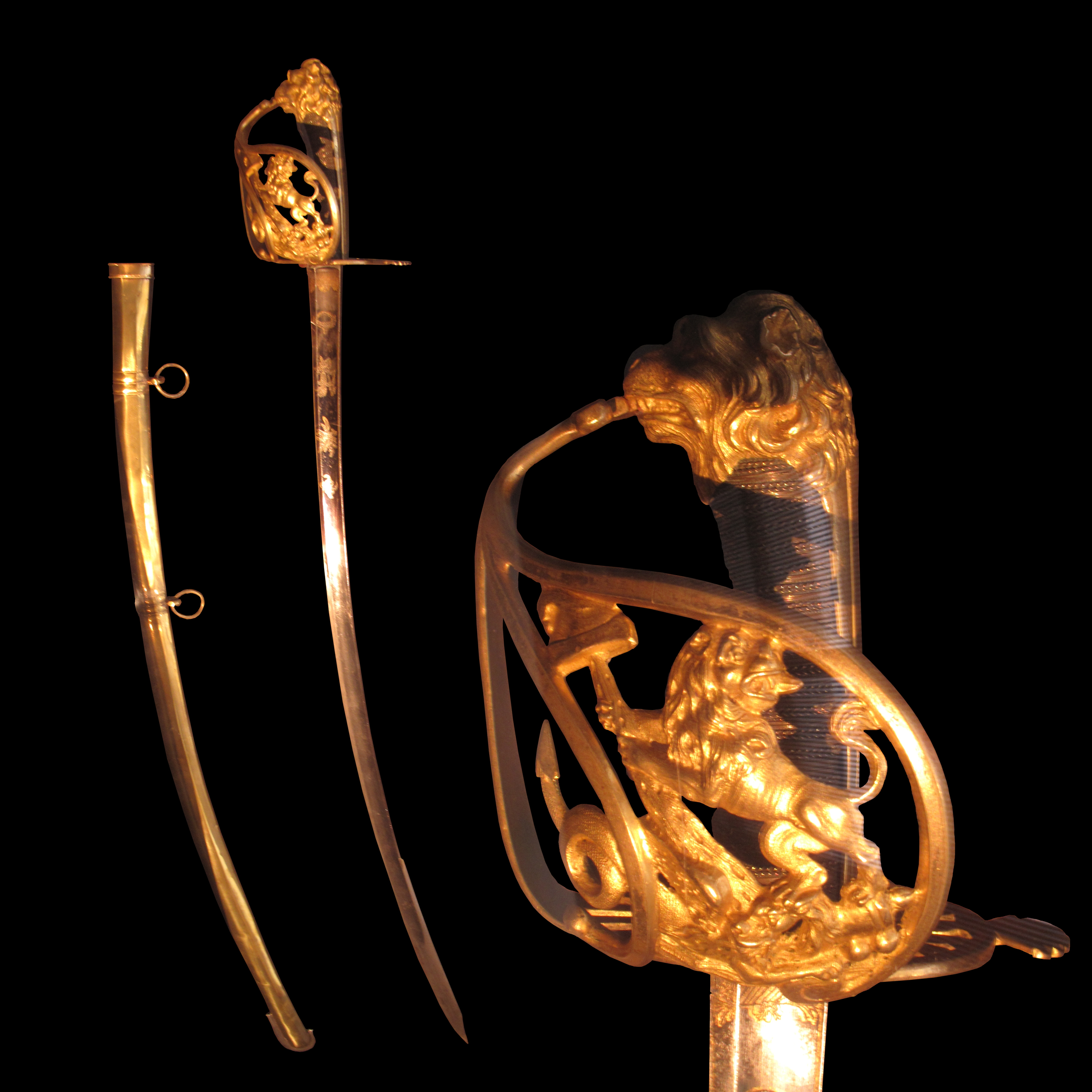
Lafayette's saber as general of the Garde nationale, on display at the Musée de l'Armée, Paris

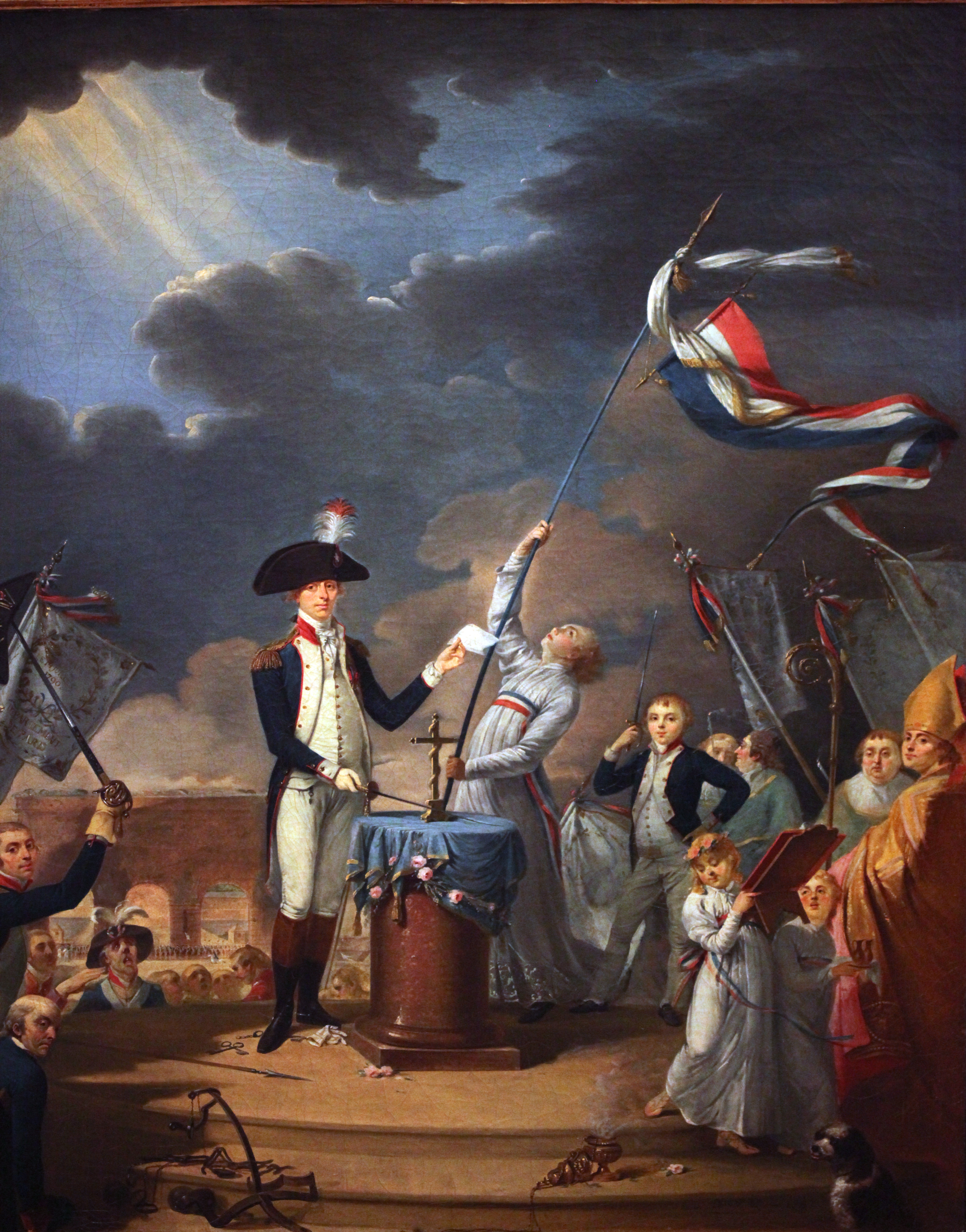
The oath of Lafayette at the Fête de la Fédération, July 14, 1790; French School, 18th century at Musée de la Révolution française

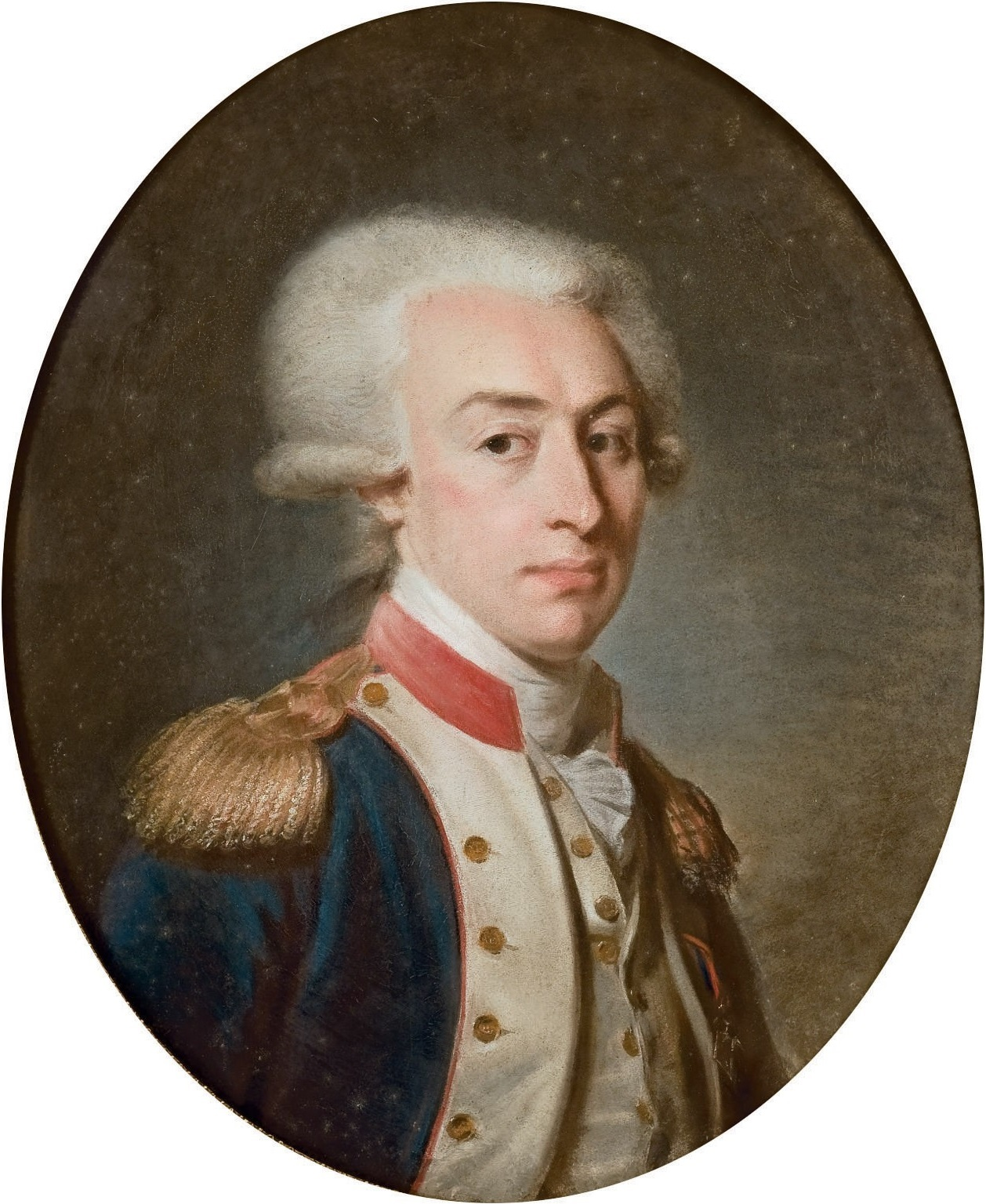
A 1791 portrait of Lafayette as lieutenant general by Jean-Baptiste Weyler

On July 15, Lafayette was acclaimed commander-in-chief of the Parisian National Guard, an armed force established to maintain order under the control of the Assembly military service as well as policing, traffic control, sanitation, lighting, among other matters of local administration. Lafayette proposed the name and the symbol of the group: a blue, white, and red cockade. This combined the red and blue colors of the city of Paris with the royal white, and originated the French tricolor. He faced a difficult task as head of the Guard; the king and many loyalists considered him and his supporters to be little better than revolutionaries, whereas many commoners felt that he was helping the king to keep power via this position.

The National Assembly approved the Declaration on August 26, but the king rejected it on October 2. Three days later, a Parisian crowd led by women fishmongers marched to Versailles in response to the scarcity of bread. Members of the National Guard followed the march, with Lafayette reluctantly leading them. At Versailles, the king accepted the Assembly's votes on the Declaration, but refused requests to go to Paris, and the crowd broke into the palace at dawn. Lafayette took the royal family onto the palace balcony and attempted to restore order, but the crowd insisted that the king and his family move to Paris and the Tuileries Palace. The king came onto the balcony and the crowd started chanting "Vive le Roi!" Marie Antoinette then appeared with her children, but she was told to send the children back in. She returned alone and people shouted to shoot her, but she stood her ground and no one opened fire. Lafayette kissed her hand, leading to cheers from the crowd.

Lafayette would later initiate an investigation within the National Assembly on the now declared October Days, which led to the production of the Procédure Criminelle by Jean-Baptiste-Charles Chabroud, a 688-page document accumulating evidence and analysis on the exact events and procedures of the March on Versailles, hoping to condemn those inciting the mob (in his mind being Mirabeau and the Duc d'Orléans). However, the National Assembly thought condemning two significant revolutionaries would hurt the progress and public reception of the revolutionary administration.

As leader of the National Guard, Lafayette attempted to maintain order and steer a middle ground, even as the radicals gained increasing influence. He and Paris' mayor Jean Sylvain Bailly instituted a political club on May 12, 1790, called the Society of 1789 whose intention was to provide balance to the influence of the radical Jacobins.

Lafayette helped organize and lead the assembly at the Fête de la Fédération on July 14, 1790, where he, alongside the National Guard and the king, took the civic oath on the Champs de Mars on July 14, 1790, vowing to "be ever faithful to the nation, to the law, and to the king; to support with our utmost power the constitution decreed by the National Assembly, and accepted by the king". In the eyes of the royalist factions, Lafayette took a large risk holding a largely undisciplined group at the Champs de Mars in fear for the safety of the king, whereas for Jacobins this solidified in their eyes Lafayette's royalist tendencies and an encouragement of the common people's support of the monarchy.

Lafayette continued to work for order in the coming months. He and part of the National Guard left the Tuileries on February 28, 1791, to handle a conflict in Vincennes, and hundreds of armed nobles arrived at the Tuileries to defend the king while he was gone. However, there were rumors that these nobles had come to take the king away and place him at the head of a counter-revolution. Lafayette quickly returned to the Tuileries and disarmed the nobles after a brief standoff. The event came to be known as the Day of Daggers, and it boosted Lafayette's popularity with the French people for his quick actions to protect the king. Nonetheless, the royal family were increasingly prisoners in their palace. The National Guard disobeyed Lafayette on April 18 and prevented the king from leaving for Saint-Cloud where he planned to attend Mass.

=== Flight to Varennes ===
On June 20, 1791, the king and queen, under the watch of Lafayette and the National Guard, escaped from the Tuileries Palace. Being notified of their escape, Lafayette sent the Guard out in a multitude of directions in order to retrieve the escapee monarchs. Five days later, Lafayette and the National Guard led the royal carriage back into Paris amidst a crowding mob calling for the heads of the monarchs as well as Lafayette. Lafayette had been responsible for the royal family's custody as leader of the National Guard, and he was thus blamed by extremists such as Georges Danton, declaring in a speech directed towards Lafayette "You swore that the king would not leave. Either you sold out your country or you are stupid for having made a promise for a person whom you could not trust... France can be free without you." He was further called a traitor to the people by Maximilien Robespierre. These accusations made Lafayette appear a royalist, damaged his reputation in the eyes of the public, and strengthened the hands of the Jacobins and other radicals in opposition to him. He continued to urge the constitutional rule of law, but he was drowned out by the mob and its leaders.

=== Champs de Mars massacre ===
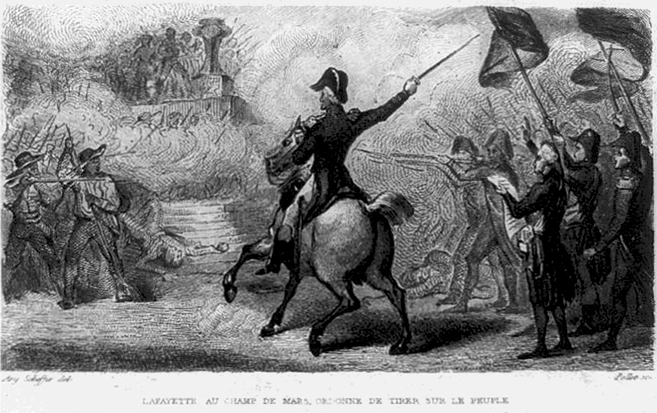
Depiction of the Champ de Mars massacre with Lafayette ordering his troops to fire on the protesters.

Lafayette's public standing continued to decline through the latter half of 1791. The radical Cordeliers organized an event at the Champ de Mars on July 17 to gather signatures on a petition to the National Assembly that it either abolish the monarchy or allow its fate to be decided in a referendum. The assembled crowd was estimated to be anywhere from 10,000 to 50,000 people. The protesters, finding two men hiding under an altar at the event, accused of being either spies or of potentially planting explosives, eventually hung the men from lampposts and placed their heads on the ends of pikes. Lafayette rode into the Champ de Mars at the head of his troops to restore order, but they were met with the throwing of stones from the crowd. Indeed, an assassination attempt was made on Lafayette, however the gunman's pistol misfired at close range. The soldiers began to first fire above the crowd in order to intimidate and disperse them, which only led to retaliation and eventually the death of two volunteer chasseurs. The National Guard was ordered to fire on the crowd, wounding and killing an unknown number of people. Accounts from those close to Lafayette claim that around ten citizens were killed in the event, whereas other accounts propose fifty-four, and the sensational newspaper publisher Jean-Paul Marat claimed over four hundred bodies had been disposed of into the river later that night.

Martial law was declared, and the leaders of the mob fled and went into hiding, such as Danton and Marat. Lafayette's reputation among many political clubs decreased dramatically, especially with articles in the press, such as the Révolutions de Paris describing the event at the Champ de Mars as "Men, Women, and Children were massacred on the altar of the nation on the Field of the Federation". Immediately after the massacre, a crowd of rioters attacked Lafayette's home and attempted to harm his wife. The Assembly finalized a constitution in September, and Lafayette resigned from the National Guard in early October, with a semblance of constitutional law restored.

=== Conflict and exile ===
Lafayette returned to his home province of Auvergne in October 1791. France declared war on Austria on April 20, 1792, and preparations to invade the Austrian Netherlands (today's Belgium) began. Lafayette, who had been promoted to Lieutenant General on June 30, 1791, received command of one of the three armies, the Army of the Centre, based at Metz, on December 14, 1791. Lafayette did his best to mold inductees and National Guardsmen into a cohesive fighting force, but found that many of his troops were Jacobin sympathizers and hated their superior officers. On April 23, 1792, Robespierre demanded that Lafayette step down. This emotion was common in the army, as demonstrated after the Battle of Marquain, when the routed French troops dragged their commander Théobald Dillon to Lille, where he was torn to pieces by the mob. One of the army commanders, Rochambeau, resigned. Lafayette, along with the third commander, Nicolas Luckner, asked the Assembly to begin peace talks, concerned at what might happen if the troops saw another battle.

In June 1792, Lafayette criticized the growing influence of the radicals through a letter to the Assembly from his field post, and ended his letter by calling for their parties to be "closed down by force". He misjudged his timing, for the radicals were in full control in Paris. Lafayette went there, and on June 28 delivered a fiery speech before the Assembly denouncing the Jacobins and other radical groups. He was instead accused of deserting his troops. Lafayette called for volunteers to counteract the Jacobins; when only a few people showed up, he understood the public mood and hastily left Paris. Robespierre called him a traitor and the mob burned him in effigy. He was transferred to command of the Army of the North on July 12, 1792.

The July 25 Brunswick Manifesto, which warned that Paris would be destroyed by the Austrians and Prussians if the king was harmed, led to the downfall of Lafayette, and of the royal family. A mob attacked the Tuileries on August 10, and the king and queen were imprisoned at the Assembly, then taken to the Temple. The Assembly abolished the monarchy – the king and queen would be beheaded in the coming months. On August 14, the minister of justice, Danton, put out a warrant for Lafayette's arrest. Hoping to travel to the United States, Lafayette entered the Austrian Netherlands.

== Imprisonment ==
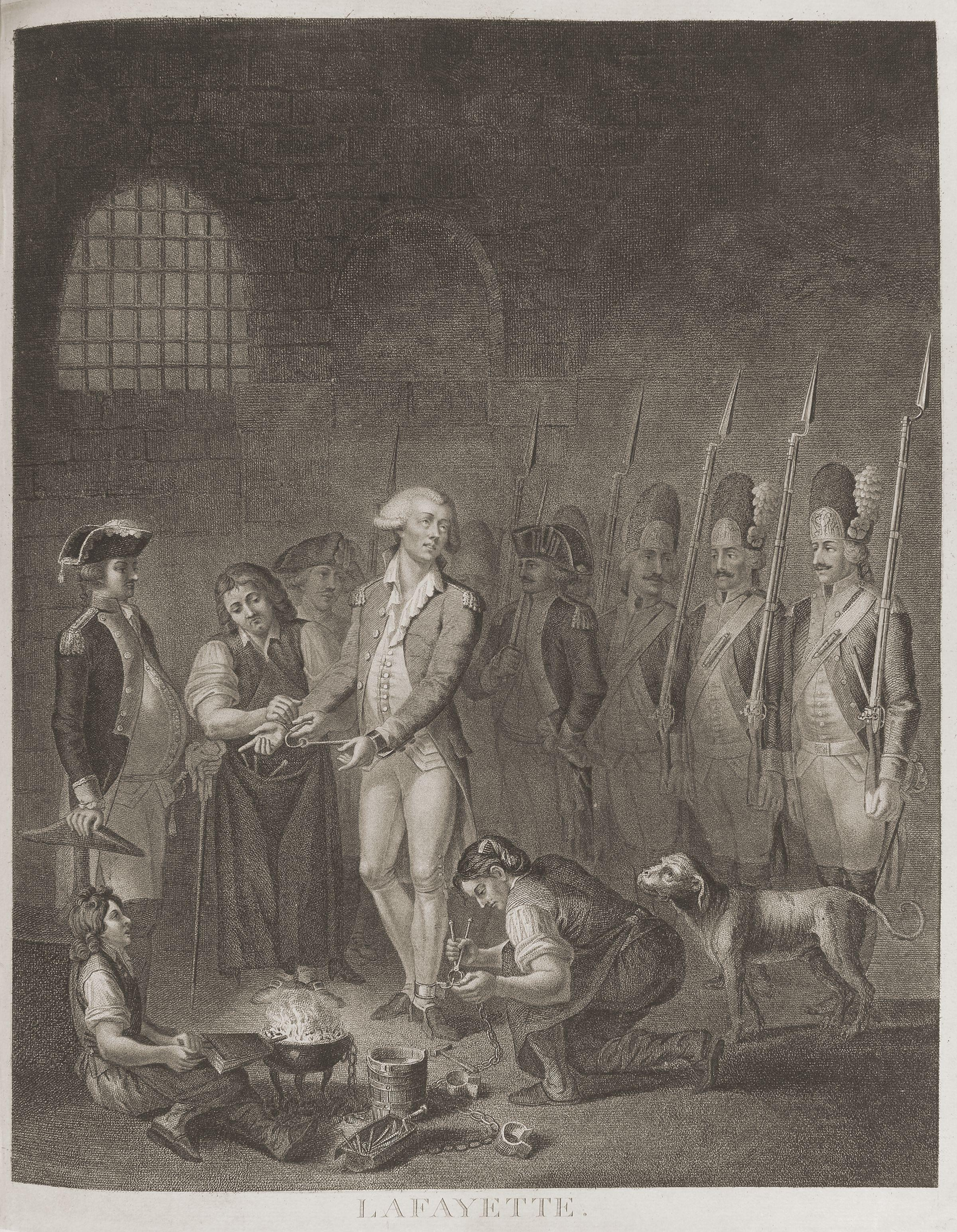
Lafayette in prison

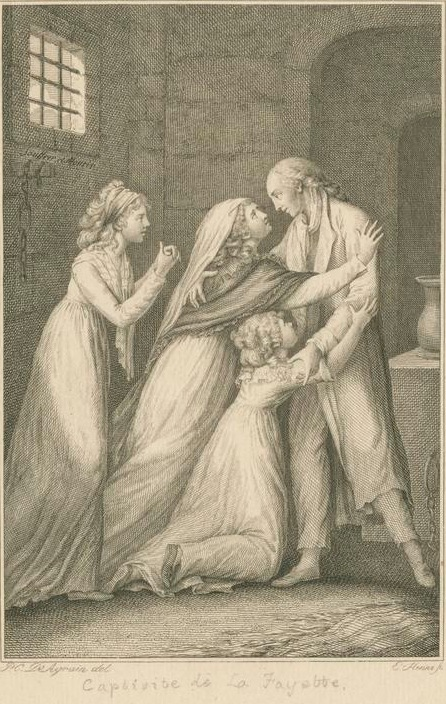
Early 19th-century depiction of Lafayette's prison reunion with his wife and daughters

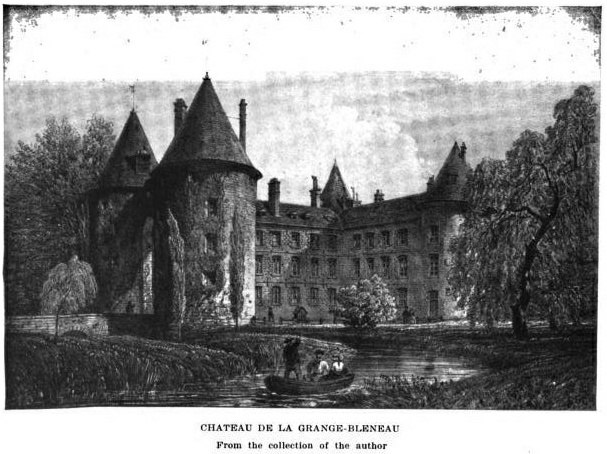
Château de la Grange-Bléneau

Lafayette was taken prisoner by the Austrians near Rochefort when another former French officer, Jean-Xavier Bureau de Pusy, asked for rights of transit through Austrian territory on behalf of a group of French officers. This was initially granted, as it had been for others fleeing France, but was revoked when the famous Lafayette was recognized. Frederick William II of Prussia, Austria's ally against France, had once received Lafayette, but that was before the French Revolution – the king now saw him as a dangerous fomenter of rebellion, to be interned to prevent him from overthrowing other monarchies.

Lafayette was held at Nivelles, then transferred to Luxembourg where a coalition military tribunal declared him, de Pusy, and two others to be prisoners of state for their roles in the Revolution. The tribunal ordered them held until a restored French king could render final judgment on them. On September 12, 1792, pursuant to the tribunal's order, the prisoners were transferred to Prussian custody. The party traveled to the Prussian fortress-city of Wesel, where the Frenchmen remained in verminous individual cells in the central citadel from September 19 to December 22, 1792. When victorious French revolutionary troops began to threaten the Rhineland, King Frederick William II transferred the prisoners east to the citadel at Magdeburg, where they remained an entire year, from January 4, 1793, to January 4, 1794.

Frederick William decided that he could gain little by continuing to battle the unexpectedly successful French forces, and that there were easier pickings for his army in the Polish-Lithuanian Commonwealth. Accordingly, he stopped armed hostilities with the Republic and turned the state prisoners back over to his erstwhile coalition partner, the Habsburg Austrian monarch Francis II, Holy Roman Emperor. Lafayette and his companions were initially sent to Neisse (today Nysa, Poland) in Silesia. On May 17, 1794, they were taken across the Austrian border, where a military unit was waiting to receive them. The next day, the Austrians delivered their captives to a barracks-prison, formerly a college of the Jesuits, in the fortress-city of Olmütz, Moravia (today Olomouc in the Czech Republic).

Lafayette, when captured, had tried to use the American citizenship he had been granted to secure his release, and contacted William Short, United States minister in The Hague. Although Short and other U.S. envoys very much wanted to aid Lafayette for his services to their country, they knew that his status as a French officer took precedence over any claim to American citizenship. Washington, who was by then president, had instructed the envoys to avoid actions that entangled the country in European affairs, and the U.S. did not have diplomatic relations with either Prussia or Austria. They did send money for the use of Lafayette, and for his wife, whom the French had imprisoned. Secretary of State Jefferson found a loophole allowing Lafayette to be paid, with interest, for his services as a major general from 1777 to 1783. An act was rushed through Congress and signed by President Washington. These funds allowed both Lafayettes privileges in their captivity.

A more direct means of aiding the former general was an escape attempt sponsored by Alexander Hamilton's sister-in-law Angelica Schuyler Church and her husband John Barker Church, a British Member of Parliament who had served in the Continental Army. They hired as agent a young Hanoverian physician, Justus Erich Bollmann, who acquired an assistant, a South Carolinian medical student named Francis Kinloch Huger. This was the son of Benjamin Huger, whom Lafayette had stayed with upon his first arrival in America. With their help, Lafayette managed to escape from an escorted carriage drive in the countryside outside Olmütz, but he lost his way and was recaptured. (Note: Bollman and Huger were captured and received short sentences, after which they were released, becoming international celebrities for their attempt to free Lafayette, See Lane, p. 218. They journeyed to America where they met with Washington and briefed him on conditions at Olmütz. See Unger, loc. 7031.)

Once Adrienne was released from prison in France, she, with the help of U.S. Minister to France James Monroe, obtained passports for her and her daughters from Connecticut, which had granted the entire Lafayette family citizenship. Her son Georges Washington had been smuggled out of France and taken to the United States. Adrienne and her two daughters journeyed to Vienna for an audience with Emperor Francis, who granted permission for the three women to live with Lafayette in captivity. Lafayette, who had endured harsh solitary confinement since his escape attempt a year before, was astounded when soldiers opened his prison door to usher in his wife and daughters on October 15, 1795. The family spent the next two years in confinement together.

Through diplomacy, the press, and personal appeals, Lafayette's sympathizers on both sides of the Atlantic made their influence felt, most importantly on the post-Reign of Terror French government. A young, victorious general, Napoleon Bonaparte, negotiated the release of the state prisoners at Olmütz, as a result of the Treaty of Campo Formio. Lafayette's captivity of over five years thus came to an end. The Lafayette family and their comrades in captivity left Olmütz under Austrian escort early on the morning of September 19, 1797, crossed the Bohemian-Saxon border north of Prague, and were officially turned over to the American consul in Hamburg on October 4.

From Hamburg, Lafayette sent a note of thanks to General Bonaparte. The French government, the Directory, was unwilling to have Lafayette return unless he swore allegiance, which he was not willing to do, as he believed it had come to power by unconstitutional means. As revenge, it had his remaining properties sold, leaving him a pauper. The family, soon joined by Georges Washington, who had returned from America, recuperated on a property near Hamburg belonging to Adrienne's aunt. Due to conflict between the United States and France, Lafayette could not go to America as he had hoped, making him a man without a country.

Adrienne was able to go to Paris, and attempted to secure her husband's repatriation, flattering Bonaparte, who had returned to France after more victories. After Bonaparte's coup d'état of 18 Brumaire (November 9, 1799), Lafayette used the confusion caused by the change of regime to slip into France with a passport in the name of "Motier". Bonaparte expressed rage, but Adrienne was convinced he was simply posing, and proposed to him that Lafayette would pledge his support, then would retire from public life to a property she had reclaimed, La Grange. France's new ruler allowed Lafayette to remain, though originally without citizenship and subject to summary arrest if he engaged in politics, with the promise of eventual restoration of civil rights. Lafayette remained quietly at La Grange, and when Bonaparte held a memorial service in Paris for Washington, who had died in December 1799, Lafayette, though he had expected to be asked to deliver the eulogy, was not invited, nor was his name mentioned.

== Retreat from politics ==
Bonaparte restored Lafayette's citizenship on March 1, 1800, and he was able to recover some of his properties. After Marengo, the First Consul offered him the post of French minister to the United States, but Lafayette declined, saying he was too attached to America to act in relation to it as a foreign envoy. In 1802, he was part of the tiny minority that voted no in the referendum that made Bonaparte consul for life. A seat in the Senate and the Legion of Honour were repeatedly offered by Bonaparte, but Lafayette again declined – though stating that he would gladly have accepted the honours from a democratic government.

In 1804, Bonaparte was crowned the Emperor Napoleon after a plebiscite in which Lafayette did not participate. The retired general remained relatively quiet, although he made Bastille Day addresses. After the Louisiana Purchase, President Jefferson asked him if he would be interested in the governorship, but Lafayette declined, citing personal problems and his desire to work for liberty in France.

During a trip to Auvergne in 1807, Adrienne became ill, suffering from complications stemming from her time in prison. She became delirious but recovered enough on Christmas Eve to gather the family around her bed and to say to Lafayette: "Je suis toute à vous" ("I am all yours"). She died the next day. In the years after her death, Lafayette mostly remained quietly at La Grange, as Napoleon's power in Europe waxed and then waned. Many influential people and members of the public visited him, especially Americans. He wrote many letters, especially to Jefferson, and exchanged gifts as he had once done with Washington.

== Bourbon restoration ==
In 1814, the coalition that opposed Napoleon invaded France and restored the monarchy; the comte de Provence (brother of the executed Louis XVI) took the throne as Louis XVIII. Lafayette was received by the new king, but the staunch republican opposed the new, highly restrictive franchise for the Chamber of Deputies that granted the vote to only 90000 men in a nation of 25 million. Lafayette did not stand for election in 1814, remaining at La Grange.

There was discontent in France among demobilized soldiers and others. Napoleon had been exiled only as far as Elba, an island in the Tuscan archipelago; seeing an opportunity, he landed at Cannes on 1 March 1815 with a few hundred followers. Frenchmen flocked to his banner, and he took Paris later that month, causing Louis to flee to Ghent. Lafayette refused Napoleon's call to serve in the new government, but accepted election to the new Chamber of Representatives under the Charter of 1815. There, after Napoleon's defeat at the Battle of Waterloo, Lafayette called for his abdication. Responding to the emperor's brother Lucien Bonaparte, Lafayette argued:

By what right do you dare accuse the nation of ... want of perseverance in the emperor's interest? The nation has followed him on the fields of Italy, across the sands of Egypt and the plains of Germany, across the frozen deserts of Russia ... The nation has followed him in fifty battles, in his defeats and in his victories, and in doing so we have to mourn the blood of three million Frenchmen.

On June 22, 1815, four days after Waterloo, Napoleon abdicated. Lafayette arranged for the former emperor's passage to America, but the British prevented this, and Napoleon ended his days on the island of Saint Helena. The Chamber of Representatives, before it dissolved, appointed Lafayette to a peace commission that was ignored by the victorious allies who occupied much of France, with the Prussians taking over La Grange as a headquarters. Once the Prussians left in late 1815, Lafayette returned to his house, a private citizen again.

Lafayette's homes, both in Paris and at La Grange, were open to any Americans who wished to meet the hero of their Revolution, and to many other people besides. Among those whom Irish novelist Sydney, Lady Morgan met at table during her month-long stay at La Grange in 1818 were the Dutch painter Ary Scheffer and the historian Augustin Thierry, who sat alongside American tourists. Others who visited included philosopher Jeremy Bentham, American scholar George Ticknor, and writer Fanny Wright.

During the first decade of the Bourbon Restoration, Lafayette lent his support to a number of conspiracies in France and other European countries, all of which came to nothing. He was involved in the various Charbonnier plots, and agreed to go to the city of Belfort, where there was a garrison of French troops, and assume a major role in the revolutionary government. Warned that the royal government had found out about the conspiracy, he turned back on the road to Belfort, avoiding overt involvement. More successfully, he supported the Greek Revolution beginning in 1821, and by letter attempted to persuade American officials to ally with the Greeks. Louis' government considered arresting both Lafayette and Georges Washington, who was also involved in the Greek efforts, but were wary of the political ramifications if they did. Lafayette remained a member of the restored Chamber of Deputies until 1823, when new plural voting rules helped defeat his bid for re-election.

== Grand tour of the United States ==
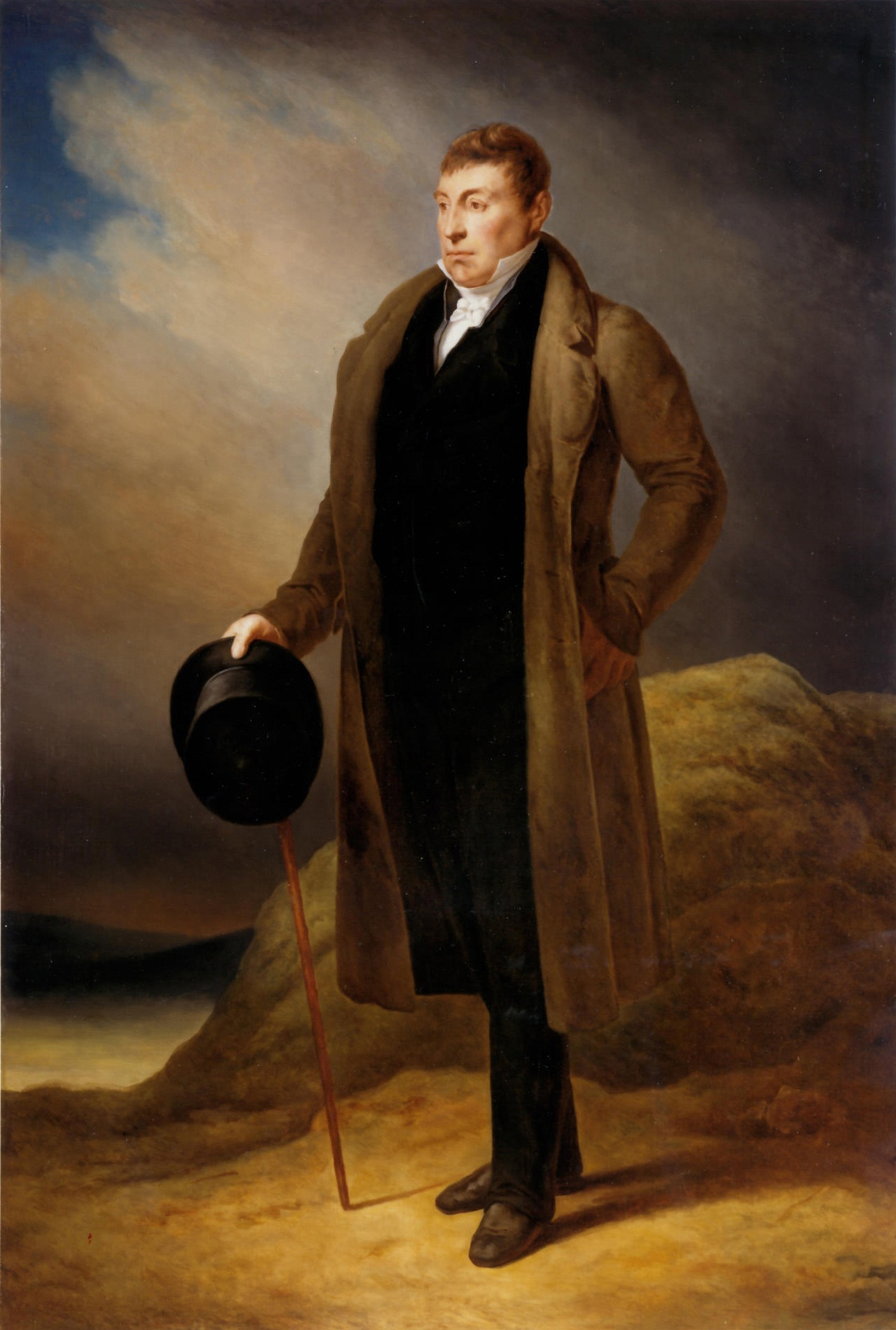
1824 portrait by Ary Scheffer, now housed in the U.S. House of Representatives

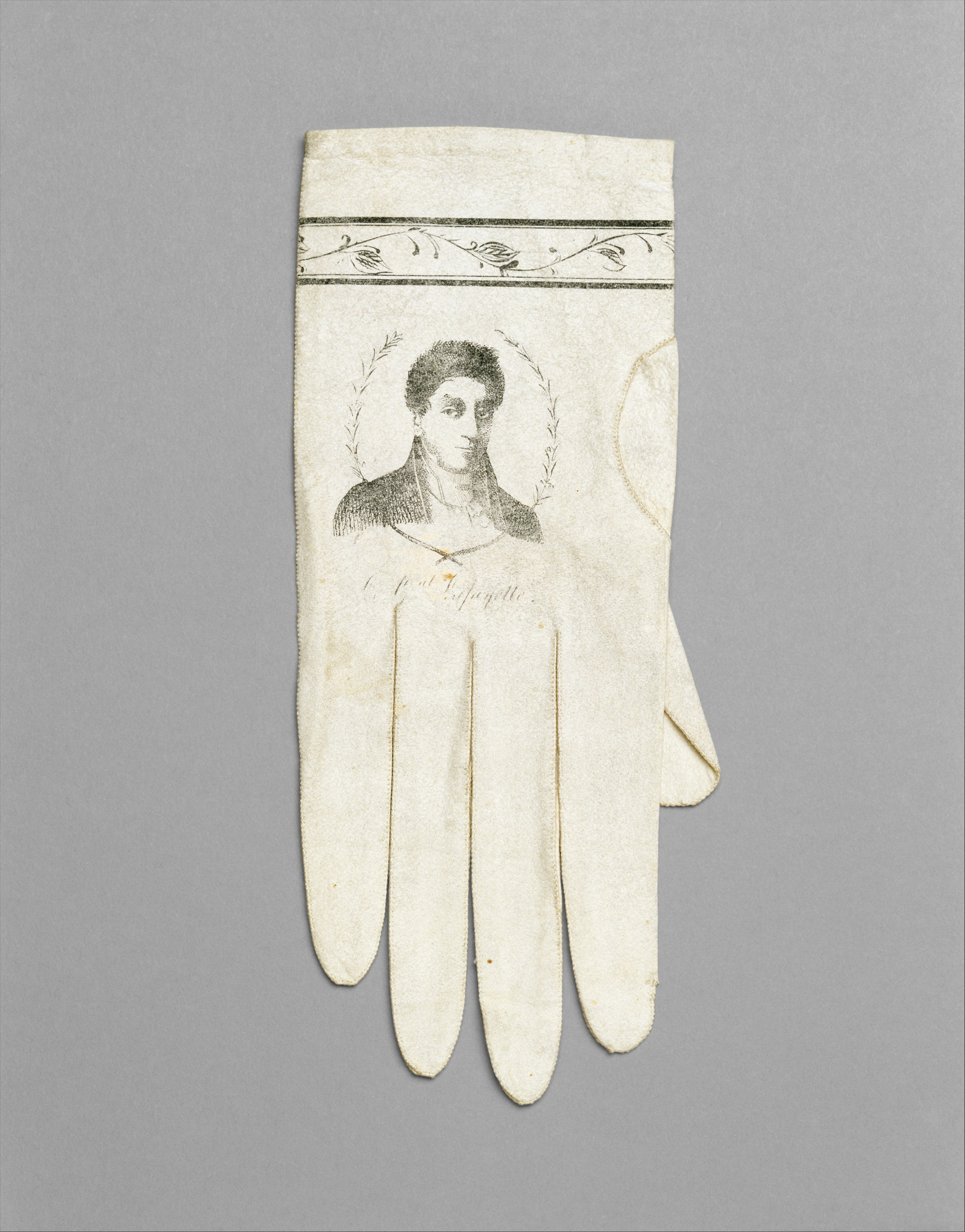
Glove portraying Lafayette, possibly commemorating his visit to the United States in 1824

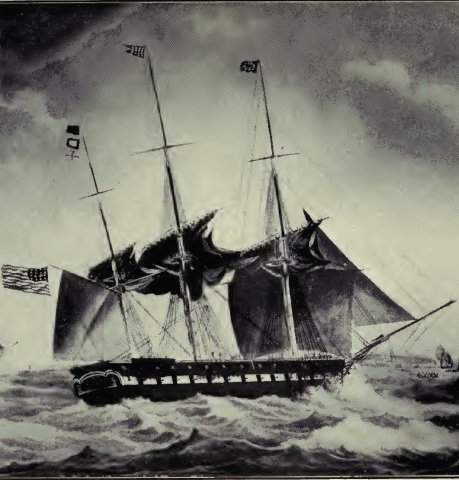
USS Brandywine, the ship that returned Lafayette to France after his 1824–1825 tour of the United States

President James Monroe and Congress invited Lafayette to visit the United States in 1824, in part to celebrate the nation's upcoming 50th anniversary. Monroe intended to have Lafayette travel on an American warship, but Lafayette felt that having such a vessel as transport was undemocratic and booked passage on the merchant packet Cadmus. Louis XVIII did not approve of the trip and had troops disperse the crowd that gathered at Le Havre to see him off.

Lafayette arrived at New York on August 15, 1824, accompanied by his son Georges Washington and his secretary Auguste Levasseur. He was greeted by a group of Revolutionary War veterans who had fought alongside him many years before. New York erupted for four continuous days and nights of celebration. He then departed for what he thought would be a restful trip to Boston but instead found the route lined by cheering citizens, with welcomes organized in every town along the way. According to Unger, "It was a mystical experience they would relate to their heirs through generations to come. Lafayette had materialized from a distant age, the last leader and hero at the nation's defining moment. They knew they and the world would never see his kind again."

New York, Boston, and Philadelphia did their best to outdo one another in the celebrations honoring Lafayette. Philadelphia renovated the Old State House (today Independence Hall) which might otherwise have been torn down, because they needed a location for a reception for him. Until that point, it had not been usual in the United States to build monuments, but Lafayette's visit set off a wave of construction – usually with him laying the cornerstone himself, in his capacity as mason. The arts benefited by his visit, as well, as many cities commissioned portraits for their civic buildings, and the likenesses were seen on innumerable souvenirs. Lafayette had intended to visit only the original 13 states during a four-month visit, but the stay stretched to 16 months as he visited all 24 states.

The towns and cities that he visited gave him enthusiastic welcomes, including Fayetteville, North Carolina, the first city named in his honor. He visited the capital in Washington City, and was surprised by the simple clothing worn by President Monroe and the lack of any guards around the White House. He went to Mount Vernon in Virginia as he had 40 years before, this time viewing Washington's grave. He was at Yorktown on October 19, 1824, for the anniversary of Cornwallis's surrender, then journeyed to Monticello to meet with his old friend Jefferson – and Jefferson's successor James Madison, who arrived unexpectedly. He had also dined with 89-year-old John Adams, the other living former president, at Peacefield, his home near Boston.

With the roads becoming impassable, Lafayette stayed in Washington City for the winter of 1824–1825 and thus was there for the climax of the hotly contested 1824 election in which no presidential candidate was able to secure a majority of the Electoral College, throwing the decision to the House of Representatives. On February 9, 1825, the House selected Secretary of State John Quincy Adams as president; that evening, runner-up General Andrew Jackson shook hands with Adams at the White House as Lafayette looked on.

In March 1825, Lafayette began to tour the southern and western states. The general pattern of the trip was that he would be escorted between cities by the state militia, and he would enter each town through specially constructed arches to be welcomed by local politicians or dignitaries, all eager to be seen with him. There would be special events, visits to battlefields and historic sites, celebratory dinners, and time set aside for the public to meet the legendary hero of the Revolution.

Lafayette visited General Jackson at his home The Hermitage in Tennessee. He was traveling up the Ohio River by steamboat when the vessel sank beneath him, and he was put in a lifeboat by his son and secretary, then taken to the Kentucky shore and rescued by another steamboat that was going in the other direction. Its captain insisted on turning around, however, and taking Lafayette to Louisville, Kentucky. From there, he went generally northeast, viewing Niagara Falls and taking the Erie Canal to Albany, considered a modern marvel. He laid the cornerstone of the Bunker Hill Monument in Massachusetts in June 1825 after hearing an oration by Daniel Webster. He also took some soil from Bunker Hill to be sprinkled on his grave.

After Bunker Hill, Lafayette went to Maine and Vermont, thus visiting all of the states. He met again with John Adams, then went back to New York and then to Brooklyn, where he laid the cornerstone for its public library. He celebrated his 68th birthday on September 6 at a reception with President John Quincy Adams at the White House and departed the next day. He took gifts with him, besides the soil to be placed on his grave. Congress had voted him $200,000 (equal to $5,691,176 today) in gratitude for his services to the country at President Monroe's request, along with a large tract of public lands in Florida. He returned to France aboard a ship that was originally called the Susquehanna but was renamed the USS Brandywine in honor of the battle where he shed his blood for the United States.

== Revolution of 1830 ==
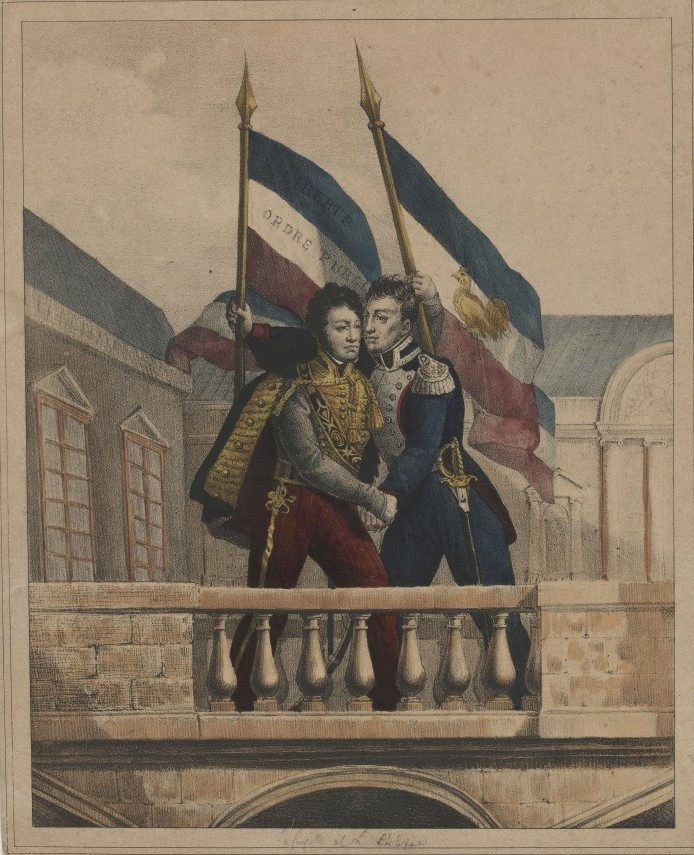
Lafayette and duc d'Orléans on balcony of Hôtel de Ville, Paris, July 31, 1830

When Lafayette arrived in France, Louis XVIII had been dead about a year and Charles X was on the throne. As king, Charles intended to restore the absolute rule of the monarch, and his decrees had already prompted protest by the time Lafayette arrived. Lafayette was the most prominent of those who opposed the king. In the elections of 1827, the 70-year-old Lafayette was elected to the Chamber of Deputies again. Unhappy at the outcome, Charles dissolved the Chamber, and ordered a new election: Lafayette again won his seat.

Lafayette remained outspoken against Charles' restrictions on civil liberties and the newly introduced censorship of the press. He made fiery speeches in the Chamber, denouncing the new decrees and advocating American-style representative government. He hosted dinners at La Grange, for Americans, Frenchmen, and others; all came to hear his speeches on politics, freedom, rights, and liberty. He was popular enough that Charles felt he could not be safely arrested, but Charles' spies were thorough: one government agent noted "his [Lafayette's] seditious toasts ... in honor of American liberty".

On July 25, 1830, the king signed the Ordinances of Saint-Cloud, removing the franchise from the middle class and dissolving the Chamber of Deputies. The decrees were published the following day. On July 27, Parisians erected barricades throughout the city, and riots erupted. In defiance, the Chamber continued to meet. When Lafayette, who was at La Grange, heard what was going on, he raced into the city, and was acclaimed as a leader of the revolution. When his fellow deputies were indecisive, Lafayette went to the barricades, and soon the royalist troops were routed. Fearful that the excesses of the 1789 revolution were about to be repeated, deputies made Lafayette head of a restored National Guard, and charged him with keeping order. The Chamber was willing to proclaim him as ruler, but he refused a grant of power he deemed unconstitutional. He also refused to deal with Charles, who abdicated on August 2. Many young revolutionaries sought a republic, but Lafayette felt this would lead to civil war, and chose to offer the throne to the duc d'Orleans, Louis-Philippe, who had lived in America and had far more of a common touch than did Charles. Lafayette secured the agreement of Louis-Philippe, who accepted the throne, to various reforms. The general remained as commander of the National Guard. This did not last long – the brief concord at the king's accession soon faded, and the conservative majority in the Chamber voted to abolish Lafayette's National Guard post on December 24, 1830. Lafayette went back into retirement, expressing his willingness to do so.

== Final years and death ==
Lafayette grew increasingly disillusioned with Louis-Phillippe, who backtracked on reforms and denied his promises to make them. The retired general angrily broke with his king, a breach which widened when the government used force to suppress a strike in Lyon. Lafayette used his seat in the Chamber to promote liberal proposals, and his neighbors elected him mayor of the village of La Grange and to the council of the département of Seine-et-Marne in 1831. The following year, he served as a pallbearer and spoke at the funeral of General Jean Maximilien Lamarque, another opponent of Louis-Phillippe. He pleaded for calm, but there were riots in the streets and a barricade was erected at the Place de la Bastille. The king forcefully crushed this June Rebellion, to Lafayette's outrage. He returned to La Grange until the Chamber met in November 1832, when he condemned Louis-Phillippe for introducing censorship, as Charles X had.

Lafayette spoke publicly for the last time in the Chamber of Deputies on January 3, 1834. The next month, he collapsed at a funeral from pneumonia. He recovered, but the following May was wet, and he became bedridden after being caught in a thunderstorm. He died at age 76 on May 20, 1834, at 6 rue d'Anjou-Saint-Honoré in Paris (now 8 rue d'Anjou in the 8th arrondissement of Paris). He was buried next to his wife at the Picpus Cemetery under soil from Bunker Hill, which his son Georges Washington sprinkled upon him. King Louis-Philippe ordered a military funeral in order to keep the public from attending, and crowds formed to protest their exclusion.

In the United States, President Jackson ordered that Lafayette receive the same memorial honors that had been bestowed on Washington at his death in December 1799. Both Houses of Congress were draped in black bunting for 30 days, and members wore mourning badges. Congress urged Americans to follow similar mourning practices. Later that year, former president John Quincy Adams gave a eulogy of Lafayette that lasted three hours, calling him "high on the list of the pure and disinterested benefactors of mankind".

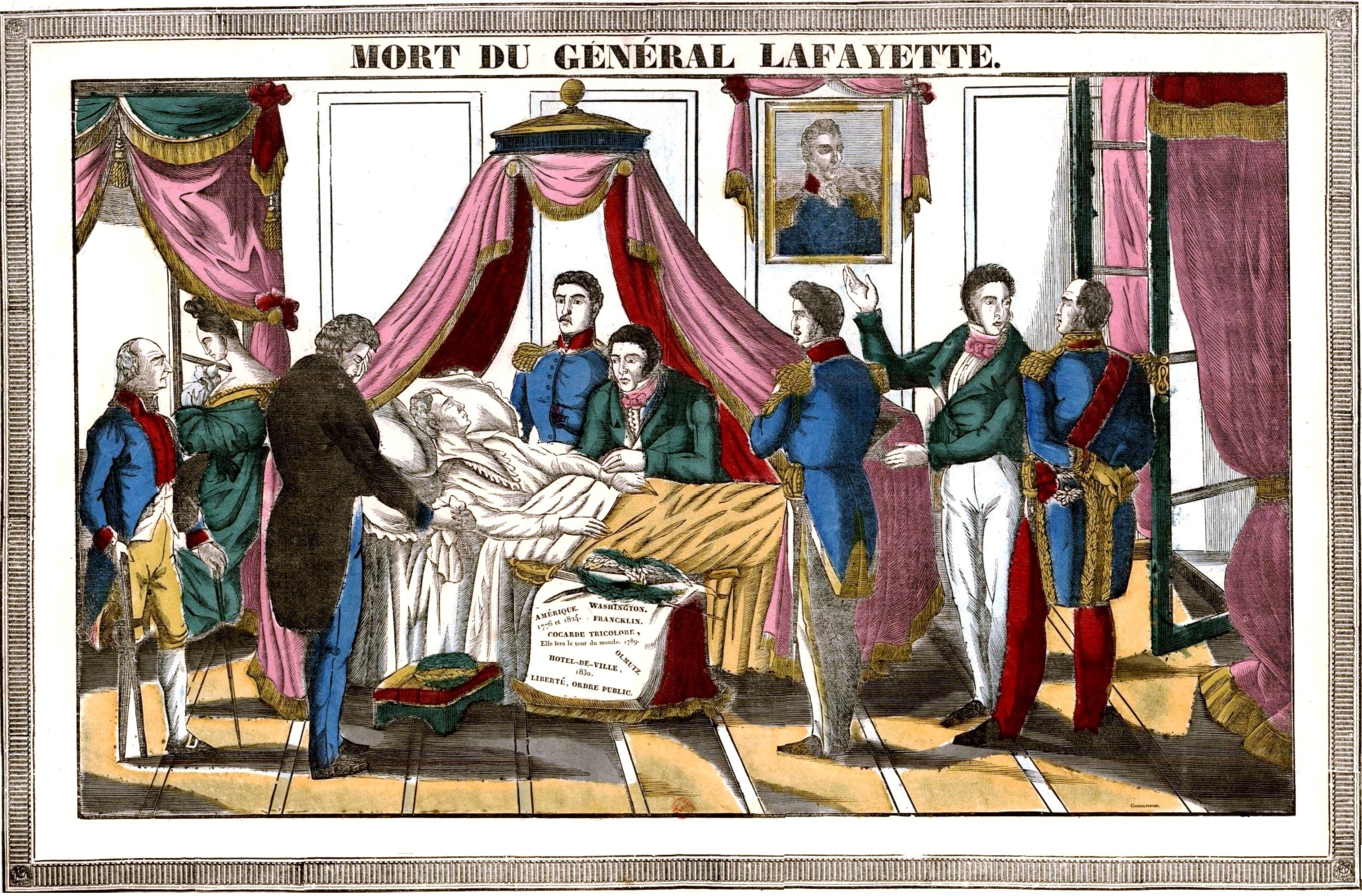
Mort du général Lafayette by Gondelfinger, 1834

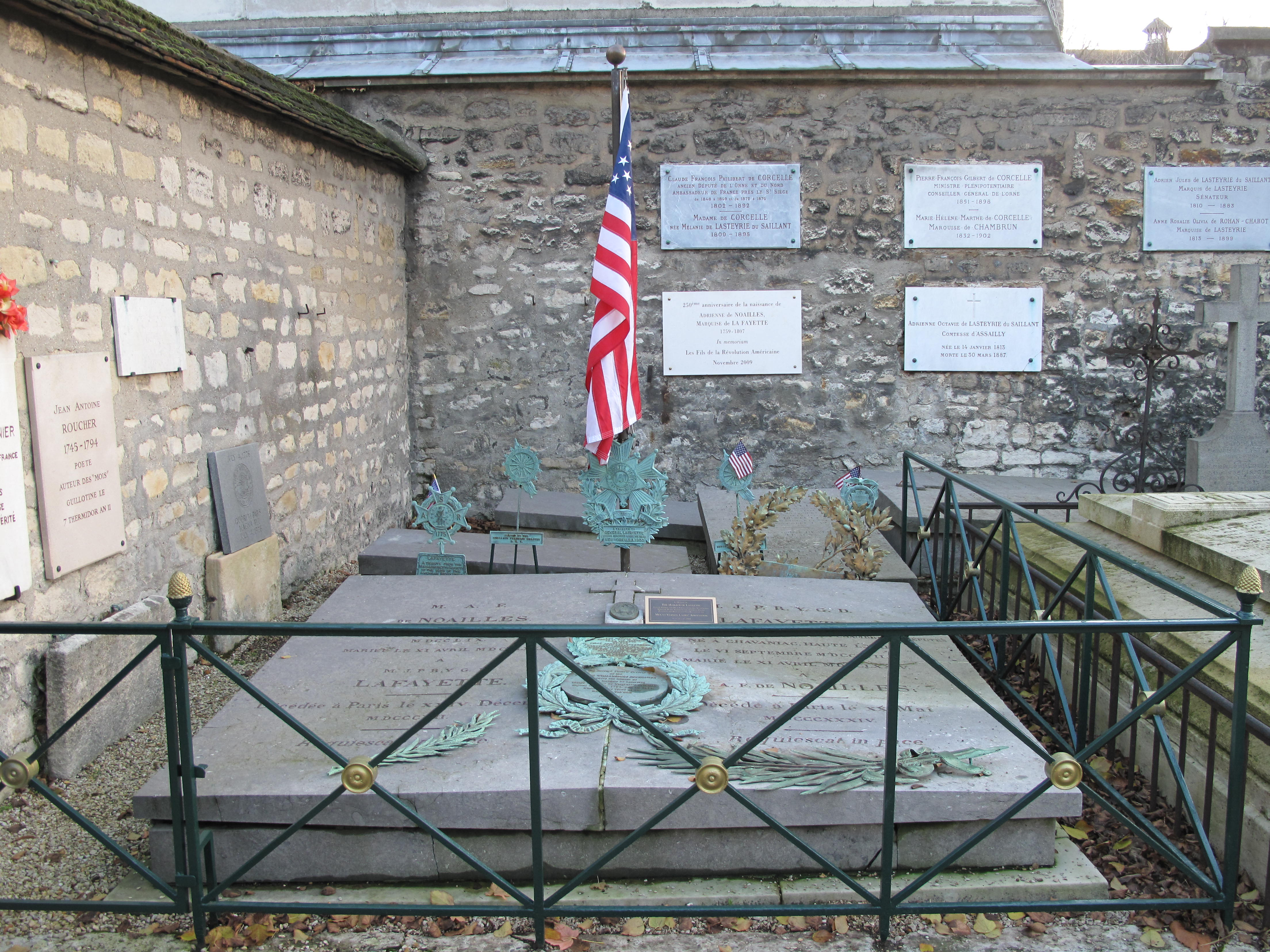
The grave of Lafayette in the Picpus Cemetery, Paris

== Beliefs ==
=== Support of a constitutional monarchy ===
Lafayette was a firm believer in a constitutional monarchy. He believed that traditional and revolutionary ideals could be melded together by having a democratic National Assembly work with a monarch, as France always had. His close relationships to American Founding Fathers such as George Washington and Thomas Jefferson gave him an opportunity to witness the implementation of a democratic system. His views on potential government structures for France were directly influenced by the American form of government, which was in turn influenced by the British form of government. For example, Lafayette believed in a bicameral legislature, as the United States had. The Jacobins detested the idea of a monarchy in France, which led the National Assembly to vote against it. This idea contributed to his fall from favour, especially when Maximilien Robespierre took power.

=== Opposition to slavery ===
Lafayette was the author of the Declaration of the Rights of Man and of the Citizen in 1789 and a staunch opponent of slavery. His work never specifically mentioned slavery, but he made his position clear on the topic through letters addressed to friends and colleagues such as Washington and Jefferson. Lafayette proposed that slaves not be owned but rather work as free tenants on the lands of plantation owners.

To put these theories into practise Lafayette purchased the French Guianese sugarcane plantation "La Belle Gabrielle" in 1785 or 1786. He ordered that the approximately 60 slaves on the plantation be educated and paid for their labor, along with forbidding them from being sold or punished more severely than white people. Lafayette aimed to show that under these conditions the slaves' birth rate would rise and their infant mortality decrease, thus eliminating the need for the slave trade. The experiment's fate appears unclear. According to some scholars, the experiment seem to have only been partially accomplished, if not at all. After the death of the plantation's manager, Richeprey, in 1787, the experiment seems to have ended.

He spent his lifetime as an abolitionist, proposing that slaves be emancipated slowly as he recognized the crucial role that slavery played in many economies. Lafayette hoped that his ideas would be adopted by Washington to free slaves in the United States and spread from there. Washington eventually began implementing those practices on his own plantation in Mount Vernon, but continued to own slaves until his death. According to Thomas Clarkson in a letter published by The Liberator, Lafayette often said to him, "I would never have drawn my sword in the cause of America, if I could have conceived that thereby I was founding a land of Slavery."

== Assessment ==
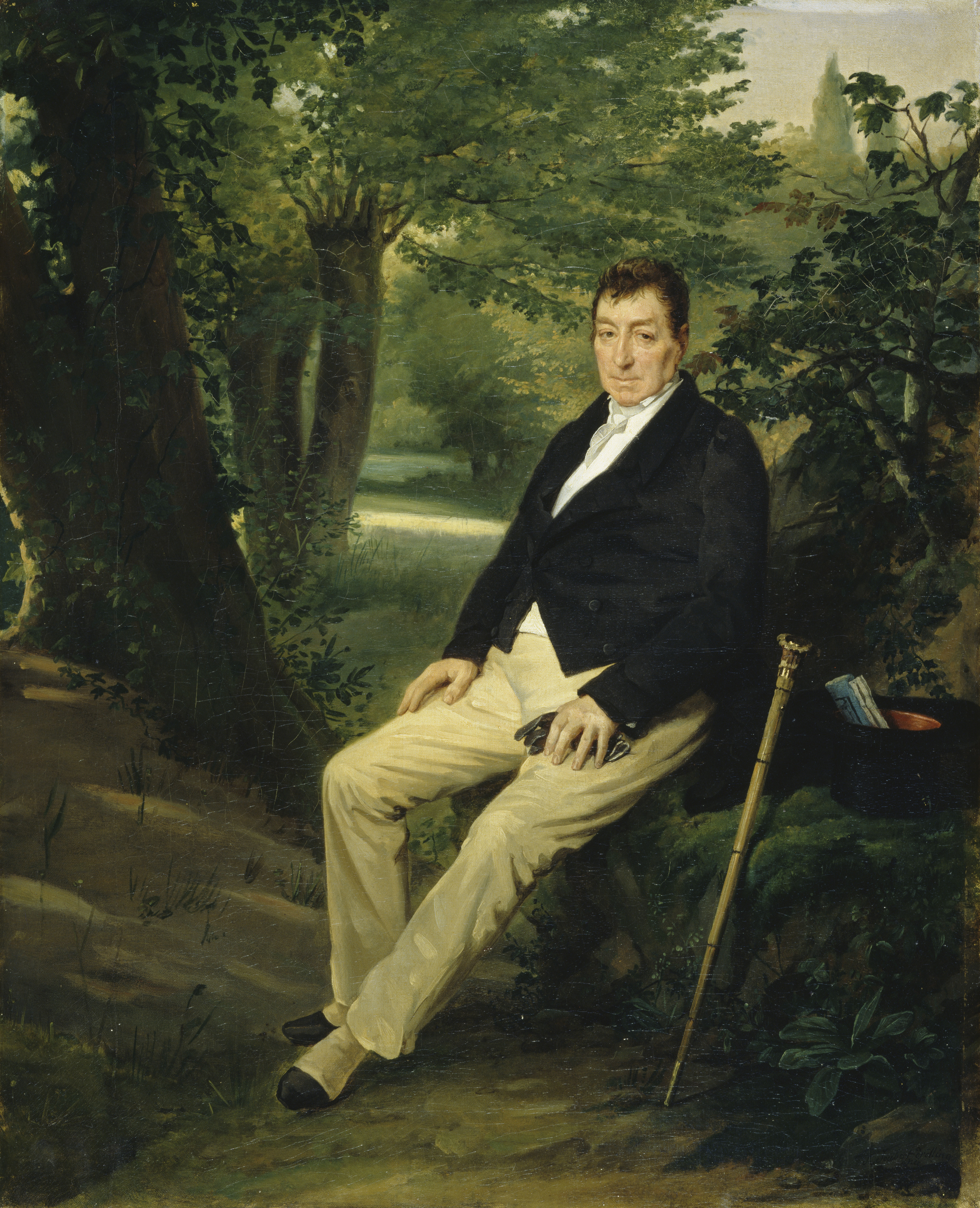
Lafayette in the Park of Château de la Grange-Bléneau, 1830, by Louise-Adéone Drölling, Musée de l'armée, Paris

Throughout his life, Lafayette was an exponent of the ideals of the Age of Enlightenment, especially on human rights and civic nationalism, and his views were taken very seriously by intellectuals and others on both sides of the Atlantic. His image in the United States was derived from his "disinterestedness" in fighting without pay for the freedom of a country that was not his own. Samuel Adams praised him for "foregoing the pleasures of Enjoyment of domestick Life and exposing himself to the Hardship and Dangers" of war when he fought "in the glorious cause of freedom". This view was shared by many contemporaries, establishing an image of Lafayette seeking to advance the freedom of all mankind rather than the interests of just one nation. During the French Revolution, Americans viewed him as an advocate for American ideals, seeking to transport them from New World to Old. This was reinforced by his position as surrogate son and disciple of George Washington, seen as the father of his country and the embodiment of American ideals. Novelist James Fenimore Cooper befriended Lafayette during his time in Paris in the 1820s. He admired his patrician liberalism and eulogized him as a man who "dedicated youth, person, and fortune to the principles of liberty."

Lafayette became an American icon in part because he was not associated with any particular region of the country; he was of foreign birth, did not live in America, and had fought in New England, the mid-Atlantic states, and the South, making him a unifying figure. His role in the French Revolution enhanced this popularity, as Americans saw him steering a middle course. Americans were naturally sympathetic to a republican cause, but also remembered Louis XVI as an early friend of the United States. When Lafayette fell from power in 1792, Americans tended to blame factionalism for the ouster of a man who was above such things in their eyes.

External videos
- Booknotes interview with Lloyd Kramer on Lafayette in Two Worlds: Public Cultures and Identities in an Age of Revolutions, 15 September 1996, C-SPAN

In 1824, Lafayette returned to the United States at a time when Americans were questioning the success of the republic in view of the disastrous economic Panic of 1819 and the sectional conflict resulting in the Missouri Compromise. Lafayette's hosts considered him a judge of how successful independence had become. According to cultural historian Lloyd Kramer, Lafayette "provided foreign confirmations of the self-image that shaped America's national identity in the early nineteenth century and that has remained a dominant theme in the national ideology ever since: the belief that America's Founding Fathers, institutions, and freedom created the most democratic, egalitarian, and prosperous society in the world".

Historian Gilbert Chinard wrote in 1936: "Lafayette became a legendary figure and a symbol so early in his life, and successive generations have so willingly accepted the myth, that any attempt to deprive the young hero of his republican halo will probably be considered as little short of iconoclastic and sacrilegious." That legend has been used politically; the name and image of Lafayette were repeatedly invoked in 1917 to gain popular support for America's entry into World War I, culminating with Charles E. Stanton's famous statement "Lafayette, we are here". This occurred at some cost to Lafayette's image in America; veterans returned from the front singing "We've paid our debt to Lafayette, who the hell do we owe now?" According to Anne C. Loveland, "Lafayette no longer served as a national hero-symbol" by the end of the war. In 2002, however, Congress voted to grant him honorary citizenship.

Lafayette's reputation in France is more problematic. Thomas Gaines notes that the response to Lafayette's death was far more muted in France than in America, and suggested that this may have been because Lafayette was the last surviving hero of America's only revolution, whereas the changes in the French government had been far more chaotic. Lafayette's roles created a more nuanced picture of him in French historiography, especially in the French Revolution. Nineteenth-century historian Jules Michelet describes him as a "mediocre idol", lifted by the mob far beyond what his talents deserved. Jean Tulard, Jean-François Fayard and Alfred Fierro note Napoleon's deathbed comment about Lafayette in their Histoire et dictionnaire de la Révolution française; he stated that "the king would still be sitting on his throne" if Napoleon had Lafayette's place during the French Revolution. They deemed Lafayette "an empty-headed political dwarf" and "one of the people most responsible for the destruction of the French monarchy". Gaines disagreed and noted that liberal and Marxist historians have also dissented from that view. Lloyd Kramer related 57% of the French deemed Lafayette the figure from the Revolution whom they most admired, in a survey taken just before the Revolution's bicentennial in 1989. Lafayette "clearly had more French supporters in the early 1990s than he could muster in the early 1790s".

Marc Leepson concluded his study of Lafayette's life:

The Marquis de Lafayette was far from perfect. He was sometimes vain, naive, immature, and egocentric. But he consistently stuck to his ideals, even when doing so endangered his life and fortune. Those ideals proved to be the founding principles of two of the world's most enduring nations, the United States and France. That is a legacy that few military leaders, politicians, or statesmen can match.

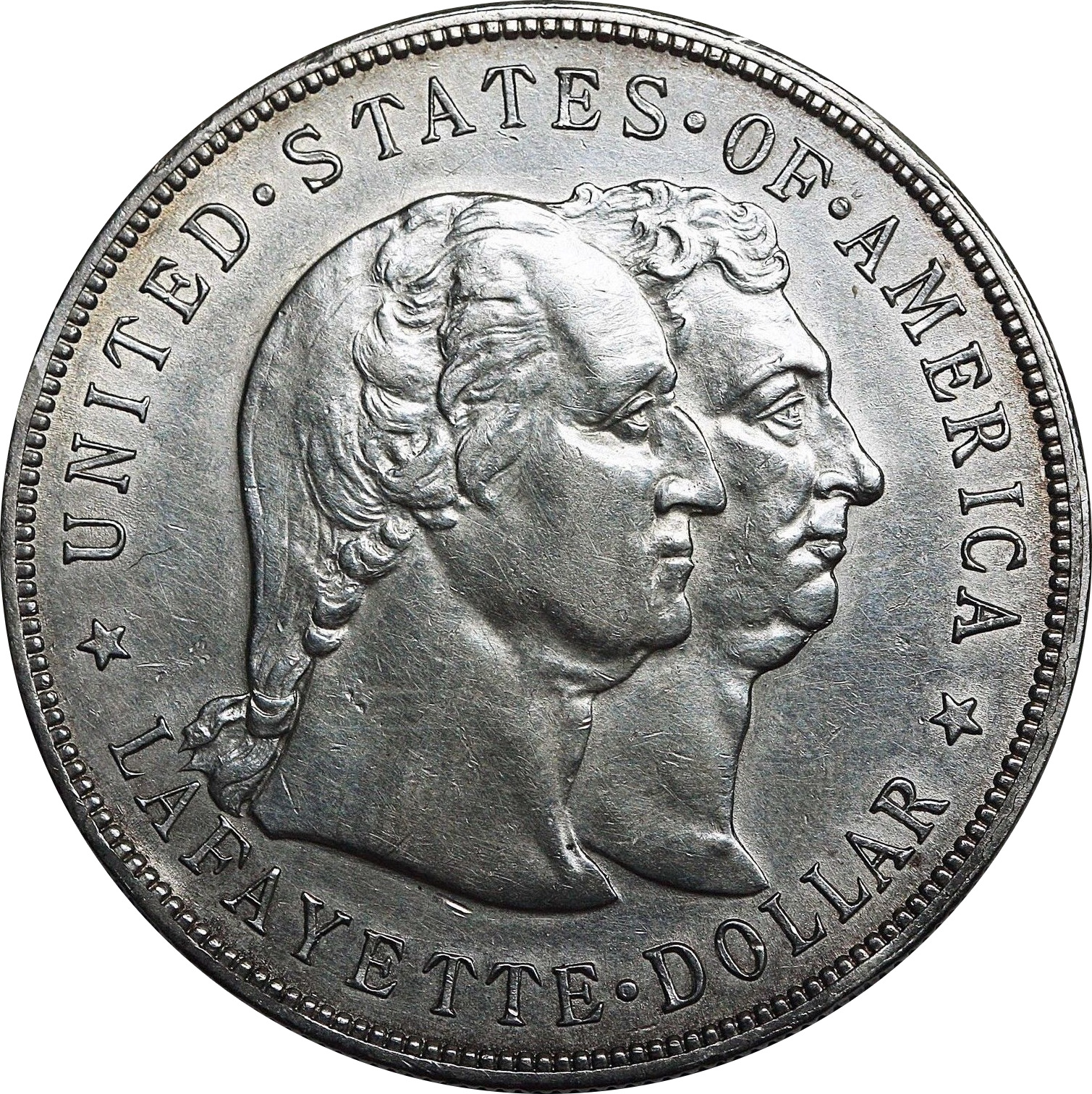
The 1899 Lafayette silver dollar, designed by Charles E. Barber, honors Lafayette and George Washington

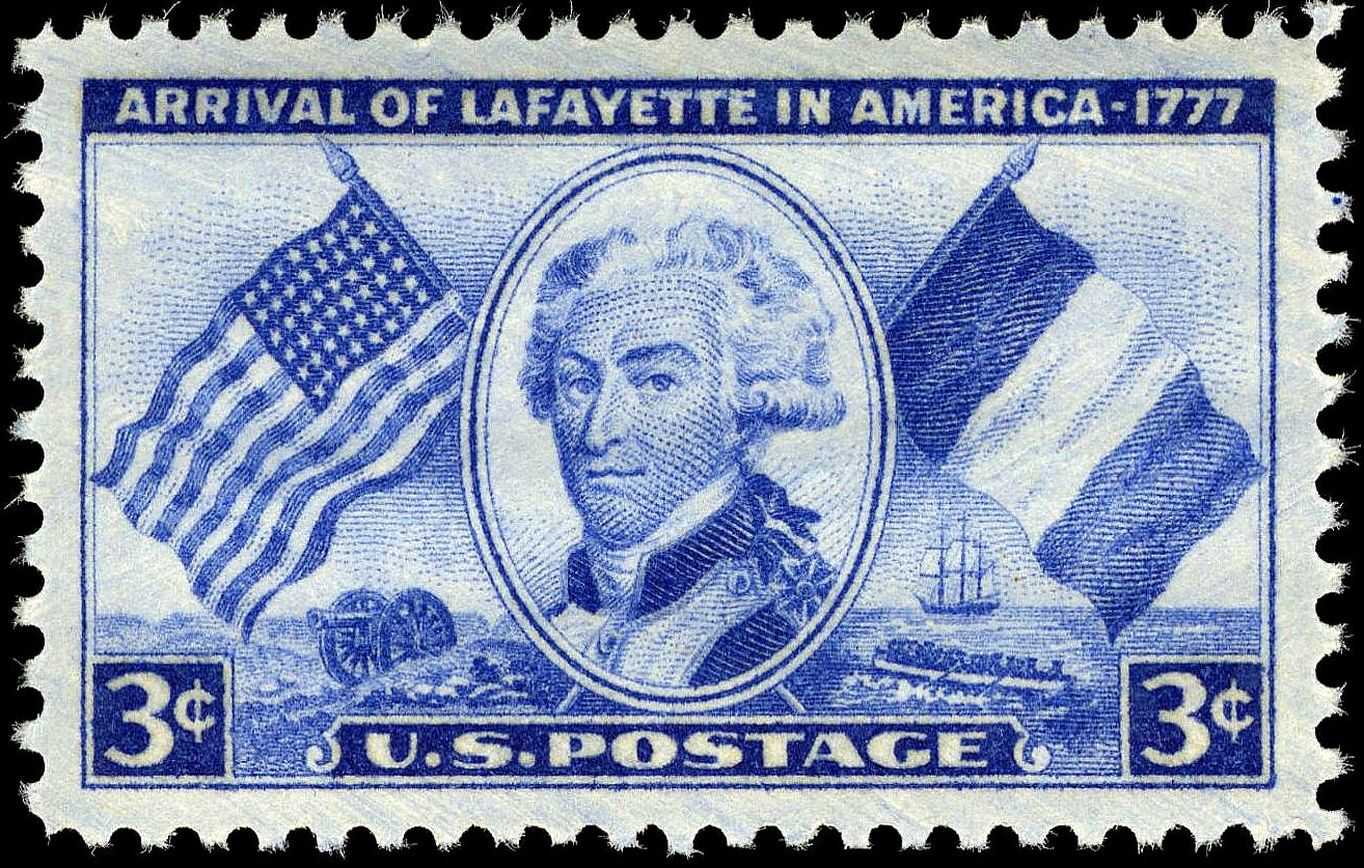
175th anniversary of Lafayette's arrival in America in 1777, 1952 issue

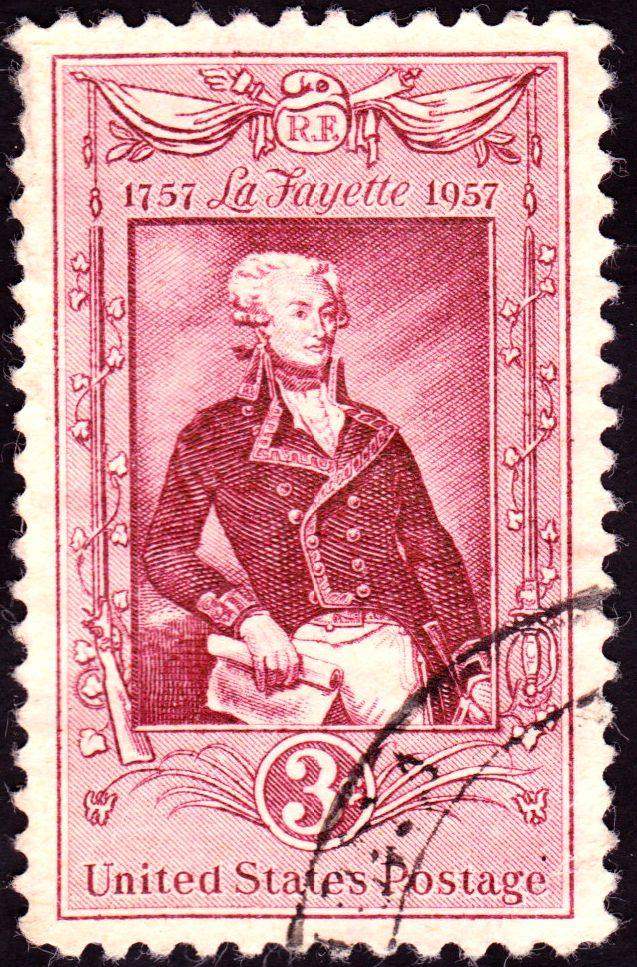
200th anniversary of the birth of Lafayette, 1957 issue

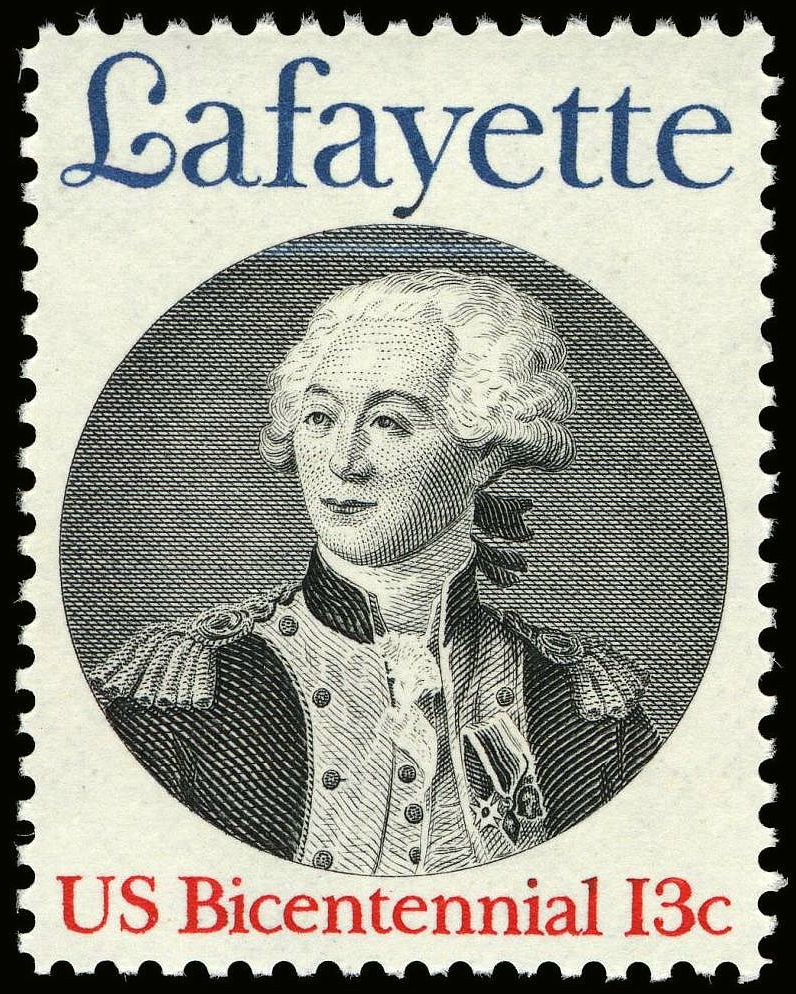
200th anniversary of Lafayette's arrival, 1977 issue as part of the Bicentennial Series

== See also ==
- Hermione (2014), a replica of the Hermione of 1779, currently in service
- Hero of Two Worlds: The Marquis de Lafayette in the Age of Revolution, a 2021 biography
- LaFayette Motors
- List of places named for the Marquis de Lafayette

== Works cited ==
- Adams, William Howard (1997). The Paris Years of Thomas Jefferson. Yale University Press. ISBN 978-0-3000-8261-6.
- Clary, David (2007). Adopted Son: Washington, Lafayette, and the Friendship that Saved the Revolution. Bantam Books. ISBN 978-0-5538-0435-5.
- Cloquet, Jules; Isaiah Townsend (1835). Recollections of the Private Life of General Lafayette. Baldwin and Cradock. OCLC 563092384.
- Crawford, Mary MacDermot (1907). Madame de Lafayette and Her Family. J. Pot & Co. OCLC 648890.
- Crowdy, Terry; Patrice Courcelle (2004). French Revolutionary Infantry 1789–1802. Osprey Publishing. ISBN 978-1-8417-6660-7.
- de La Fuye, Maurice; Émile Albert Babeau (1956). The Apostle of Liberty: A Life of Lafayette. Thomas Yoseloff. LCCN 56003815. OCLC 228312.
- Demerliac, Alain (2004). La Marine de Louis XVI: Nomenclature des Navires Français de 1774 à 1792 (in French). Éditions Ancre. ISBN 2-9063-8123-3.
- Doyle, William (1990). Oxford history of the French Revolution (3rd ed.). Oxford University Press. ISBN 978-0-1928-5221-2.
- Fiske, John (1902). Essays, Historical, and Literary: Scenes and characters in American History. Macmillan. OCLC 1087895.
- Gaines, James R. (2007). For Liberty and Glory: Washington, La Fayette, and Their Revolutions. W.W. Norton & Co. ISBN 978-0-3930-6138-3.
- Gerson, Noel B. (1976). Statue in Search of a Pedestal: a Biography of the Marquis de La Fayette. Dodd, Mead & Company. ISBN 978-0-3960-7341-3.
- Gottschalk, Louis (1939). Lady-in-waiting; the Romance of Lafayette and Aglaé de Hunolstein. Johns Hopkins Press. OCLC 513579.
- Gottschalk, Louis (1950). Lafayette: Between the American and the French Revolution (1783–1789). University of Chicago Press. OCLC 284579.
- Gottschalk, Louis (2007). Lafayette Comes to America. Read Books. ISBN 978-1-4067-2793-7. OCLC 1077678.
- Greene, Francis Vinton (1911). The Revolutionary War and the Military Policy of the United States. Charles Scribner's Sons. LCCN 11014531. OCLC 952029.
- Grizzard, Frank (2002). George Washington: Biographical Companion. ABC-CLIO. ISBN 978-1-5760-7082-6.
- Hirschfeld, Fritz (1997). George Washington and Slavery – A Documentary Portrayal. University of Missouri Press. ISBN 978-0-8262-1135-4.
- Holbrook, Sabra (1977). Lafayette, Man in the Middle. Atheneum Books. ISBN 978-0-6893-0585-6.
- Kaminsky, John (2005). A Necessary Evil?: Slavery and the Debate of the Constitution. Rowman & Littlefield. ISBN 978-0-9456-1233-9.
- Kramer, Lloyd (1996). Lafayette in Two Worlds. The University of North Carolina Press. ISBN 0-8078-2258-2.
- La Fayette Villaume Ducoudray Holstein, Henri (1824). Memoirs of Gilbert Motier La Fayette. Charles Wiley. OCLC 85790544.
- Memoirs, Correspondence and Manuscripts of General Lafayette. Vol. 3. Saunders and Otley. 1837. OCLC 10278752.
- Lane, Jason (2003). General and Madame de Lafayette (Kindle ed.). Da Capo Press. ISBN 978-1-5897-9018-6.
- Leepson, Marc (2011). Lafayette:Lessons in Leadership from the Idealist General. Palgrave Macmillan. ISBN 978-0-2301-0504-1.
- Levasseur, August (2006). Lafayette in America. Alan Hoffman. Lafayette Press. ISBN 978-0-9787-2240-1.
- Loveland, Anne (1971). Emblem of Liberty: The Image of Lafayette in the American Mind. LSU Press. ISBN 978-0-8071-2462-8.
- Martin, David (2003). The Philadelphia Campaign. Da Capo Press. ISBN 978-0-3068-1258-3.
- Maurois, André (1961). Adrienne, the Life of the Marquise de La Fayette. McGraw-Hill. OCLC 2302836.
- Morris, Gouverneur (1888). The Diary and Letters of Gouverneur Morris. Vol. I. Anne Cary Morris. C. Scribner's Sons. OCLC 833557418.
- Neely, Sylvia (2008). A Concise History of the French Revolution. Rowman & Littlefield. ISBN 978-0-7425-3411-7.
- An Officer in the Late Army (1858). A Complete History of the Marquis de Lafayette: Major-General in the American Army in the War of the Revolution. J. & H. Miller.
- Palmer, Dave Richard (2006). George Washington and Benedict Arnold: A Tale of Two Patriots. Regnery Publishing. ISBN 978-1-5969-8020-4.
- Payan, Gregory (2002). Marquis de Lafayette:French Hero of the American Revolution. The Rosen Publishing Group. ISBN 978-0-8239-5733-0.
- Spalding, Paul S. (2010). Lafayette: Prisoner of State. University of South Carolina Press. ISBN 978-1-5700-3911-9.
- Thiers, M. A.; Frederic Shoberl (1846). The History of the French Revolution. Vol. 1 (3 ed.). Richard Bentley. OCLC 2949605.
- Tower, Charlemagne (1894). The Marquis de La Fayette in the American Revolution. J.B. Lippincott Company. LCCN 09021926. OCLC 527765.
- Tuckerman, Bayard (1889). Life of General Lafayette: With a Critical Estimate of His Character and Public Acts. Dodd, Mead. OCLC 1899420.
- Unger, Harlow Giles (2002). Lafayette. John Wiley & Sons. ISBN 978-0-4713-9432-7.
- Wright, Constance (1959). Madame de Lafayette. Holt, Rhinehart, and Winston. OCLC 373722.
- Wright, Esmond (October 1957). "Lafayette: Hero of two worlds". History Today. 7 (10): 653–661.
