= Lafayette dollar =

US silver coin issued for the 1900 Paris World's Fair

- United States
- Value: 1 United States dollar
- Mass: 26.73 g (412.5 gr)
- Diameter: 38.1 mm (1.5 in)
- Edge: reeded
- Composition: 90.0% silver; 10.0% copper
- Silver: 0.77344 troy oz
- Years of minting: 1899 (a 1900 date appears on the coin)
- Mintage: 50,026 (less 26 assay coins and 14,000 melted)
- Mint marks: None. All specimens struck at Philadelphia Mint without mint mark.

Obverse
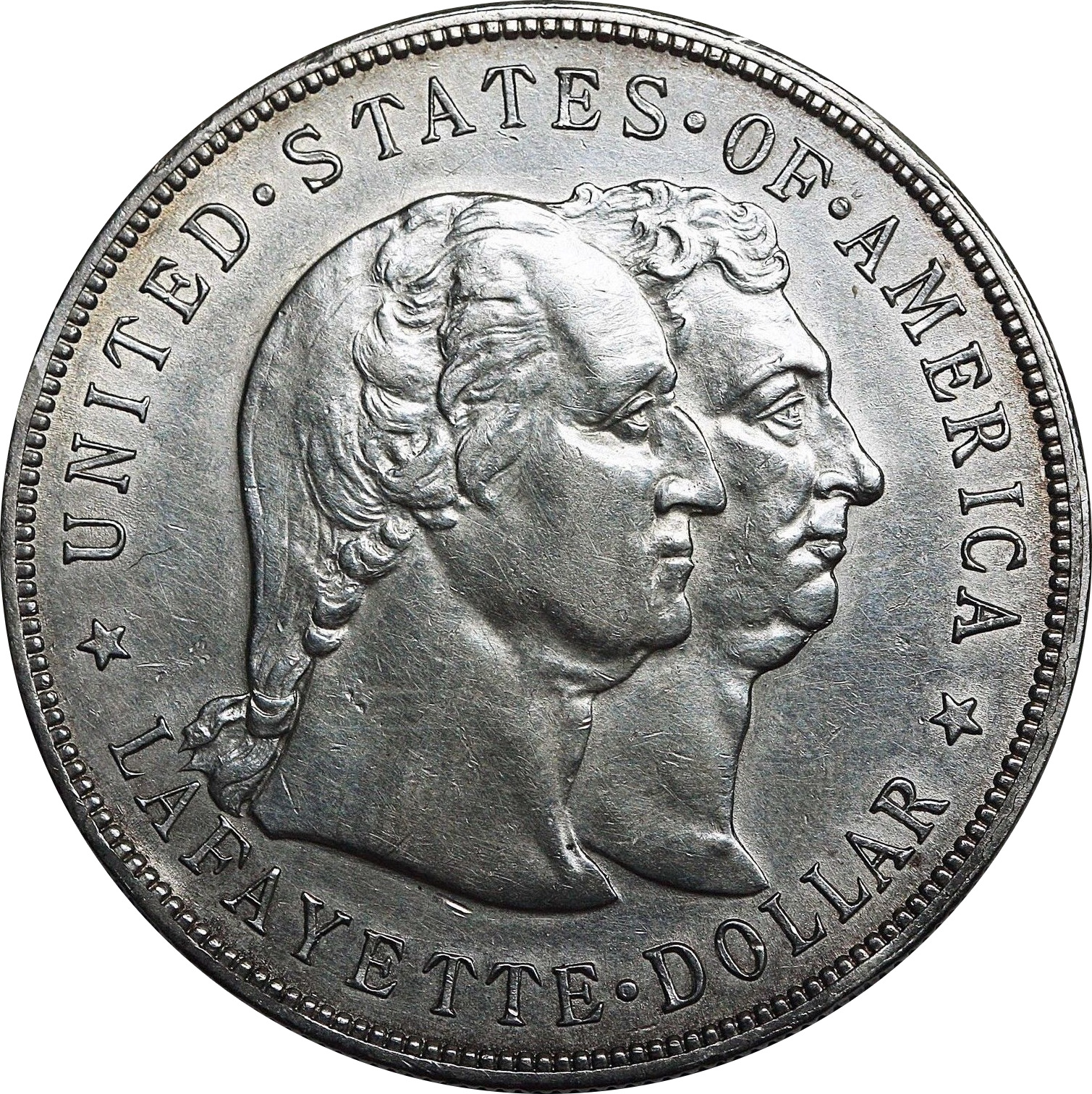
- Design: Conjoined busts of George Washington and Marquis de Lafayette
- Designer: Charles E. Barber
- Design date: 1899

Reverse
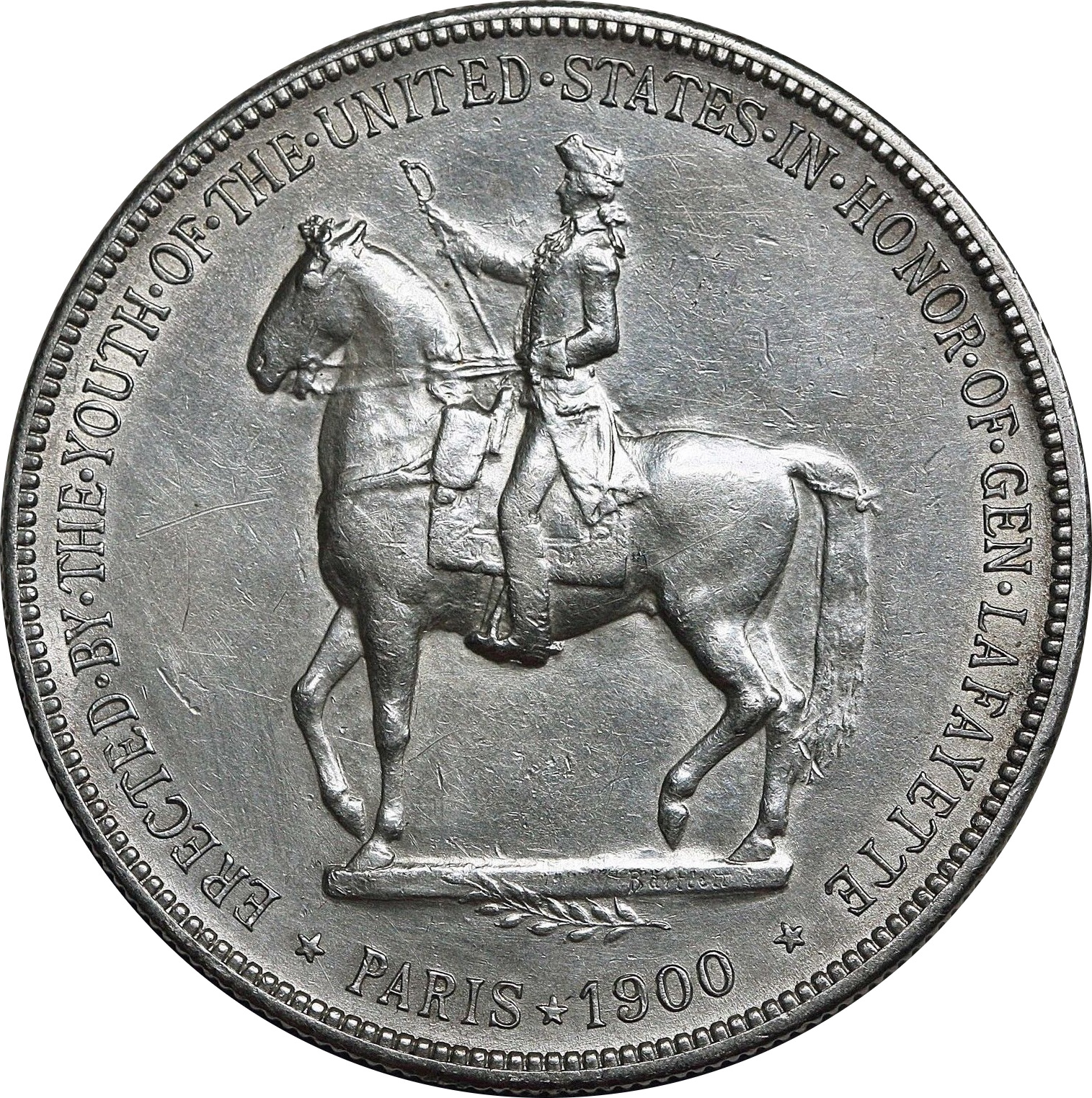
- Design: Equestrian statue of Lafayette
- Designer: Charles E. Barber
- Design date: 1899

The Lafayette dollar was a silver coin issued as part of the United States' participation in the Paris World's Fair of 1900. Depicting Gilbert du Motier, Marquis de Lafayette with George Washington, and designed by Chief Engraver Charles E. Barber, it was the only U.S. silver dollar commemorative prior to 1983, and the first U.S. coin to depict American citizens.

Beginning in 1898, prominent Americans sought to erect in Paris a monument to Lafayette, a Frenchman who fought in the American Revolutionary War. Among these supporters was Chicago businessman Ferdinand Peck, whom President William McKinley chose as commissioner-general to the exposition. Peck made the monument proposal a part of the American plans for Paris, and appointed the Lafayette Memorial Commission to raise funds for it. A part of this fundraising was the one-dollar commemorative coin, approved by Congress on March 3, 1899.

Conjoined busts of Washington and Lafayette appear on the obverse. Barber stated that the bases for his work were a sculpture of Washington by Jean-Antoine Houdon, and an 1824 medal of Lafayette by François-Augustin Caunois. For the reverse, he used an early sketch of the planned monument, designed by Paul Wayland Bartlett, whose last name appears on the base of the statue on the reverse. The coins did not sell out, and 14,000 were later melted by the United States Treasury. The Lafayette dollar is valued from several hundred dollars to tens of thousands, depending on condition.

== Background ==
Gilbert du Motier de La Fayette was born on September 6, 1757, to a noble French family. When the boy was less than two years old, his father was killed at the Battle of Minden, making the toddler a wealthy nobleman. The young marquis married in 1774.

In 1775, while on military duty in Metz, Lafayette received word of the American Revolution in the Thirteen Colonies. The young officer quickly came to believe that the American cause was noble. On learning that the Second Continental Congress lacked funds, Lafayette hired a ship at his own expense and in 1777 sailed for America, though he initially received a cold reception from the Congress. So many foreign officers had sought to be a part of the Continental Army that its commanding general, George Washington, asked that no more be engaged. Lafayette's application, which sought no pay, met with eventual success. Congress had received a letter from the American envoy to France, Benjamin Franklin, stating that Lafayette's family was wealthy and influential. Franklin urged Congress to accommodate Lafayette, and also keep him safe and out of the action lest his death harm the American cause.

Congress dutifully voted in July 1777 to commission Lafayette as a major general, and sent him to meet Washington. The two men formed a very close relationship despite a quarter-century difference in age. Franklin's wish to keep Lafayette safe was frustrated by the young man's desire to be where battles raged, and he was wounded at the Battle of Brandywine in September 1777. France soon entered the war on the American side, and was instrumental in the victory. Lafayette helped lead the decisive Yorktown campaign, leading to the surrender of Lieutenant General Lord Cornwallis alongside his entire army, which sealed the fate of the war in favor of the Americans.

May this immense Temple of Freedom ever stand, a lesson to oppressors, an example to the oppressed, a sanctuary for the rights of mankind! And may these happy United States attain that complete splendor and prosperity which will illustrate the blessings of their Government, and for ages to come rejoice the departed souls of its founders.

— Gilbert du Motier, Marquis de Lafayette, speech to the committee sent to take leave of him, 1784

Lafayette returned to France after 1781, a national hero in both countries. He returned to the United States in 1784, his last visit for 40 years. In France, he involved himself in politics, favoring a constitutional monarchy. He was given office and commands after the French Revolution, but was captured by the Austrians in 1792, remaining in captivity for five years. After Napoleon arranged his release, Lafayette remained on his estates and away from politics during the Emperor's rule. After the restoration of the monarchy in 1815, he again engaged himself in politics, sitting in the Chamber of Deputies.

In 1824, the American Congress voted unanimously to have President James Monroe invite Lafayette to return as the guest of the nation. The marquis and his son, George Washington Lafayette, arrived in New York City to mammoth celebrations. Over the next year and a half, Lafayette visited all 24 states. He was given innumerable honors and gifts, including land in Florida. The marquis returned to France in 1825, and died in 1834. One of only eight people to be made an honorary citizen of the United States, according to Arnie Slabaugh in his book on commemorative coins, "Lafayette became so popular and respected in both countries that the friendship he helped cement between the two nations has extended to this day".

== Inception ==
In March 1898, a resolution was introduced in Congress for a commission to erect a monument to Lafayette in Paris on behalf of the United States. The bill passed the Senate, and hearings were held before the House Committee on Foreign Affairs. Chicago businessman and philanthropist Ferdinand Peck testified in support of the bill, which though favored by the committee was not considered by the House due to higher priorities during the Spanish–American War.

Later in 1898, President William McKinley appointed Peck as United States Commissioner-General to the 1900 Exposition Universelle, a World's Fair to be held in Paris. Peck revived the Lafayette proposal as part of the American participation in the fair, and created a Lafayette Memorial Commission to supervise the monument project. The commission was to ensure that the monument was unveiled on July 4, 1900—both Independence Day and also United States Day at the exposition. On September 1, 1898, Peck appointed a number of prominent Americans to the commission, including Iowa Senator William B. Allison, Secretary of State William R. Day, Archbishop John Ireland, and Reverend Edward Everett Hale. The commission's officers included the treasurer, Comptroller of the Currency (and future Vice President of the United States) Charles G. Dawes, and the secretary, Robert J. Thompson.

Fundraising to build the Lafayette monument was a major component of the commission's work, and it sought to involve American schools and schoolchildren in the project. October 19, 1898—the 117th anniversary of Cornwallis's surrender at Yorktown—was proclaimed the first "Lafayette Day" by 42 governors or commissioners of education of the states or territories. Although President McKinley did not issue a similar proclamation, he did praise the plan in a letter printed in the press. Special ceremonies in honor of Lafayette (along with appropriate lesson plans) were observed in many schools, and pupils were called upon to donate cents in honor of the French patriot. A total of $45,858.30 was obtained from the events at the schools; those institutions were furnished, on the next Lafayette Day (intended to be annual), with ornate receipts, signed by Dawes and meant as momentos to descend to posterity.

Another proposed means of paying for the statue was a commemorative coin. In early 1899, the commission sought enactment of legislation granting it an appropriation of $50,000 in the form of 100,000 commemorative half dollars, that could be sold to the public at a premium. Such a method had helped to finance (though with mixed success) the 1893 World's Columbian Exposition in Chicago. Instead, Congress passed and McKinley signed on March 3, 1899, a civil appropriations bill that included provision for 50,000 silver one-dollar pieces to be granted to the commission. The bullion for the striking was to be purchased on the open market and was not to come from the Mint's remaining stocks acquired pursuant to the repealed Sherman Silver Purchase Act, though the Mint would not exhaust its inventory from that legislation until 1904. Congress placed a ceiling on the cost of the silver at $25,000. In the event, the United States Treasury bought 38,675.875 troy ounces of silver for $23,032.80. The designs were to be selected by the Mint Director, with the approval of the Secretary of the Treasury.

== Preparation ==
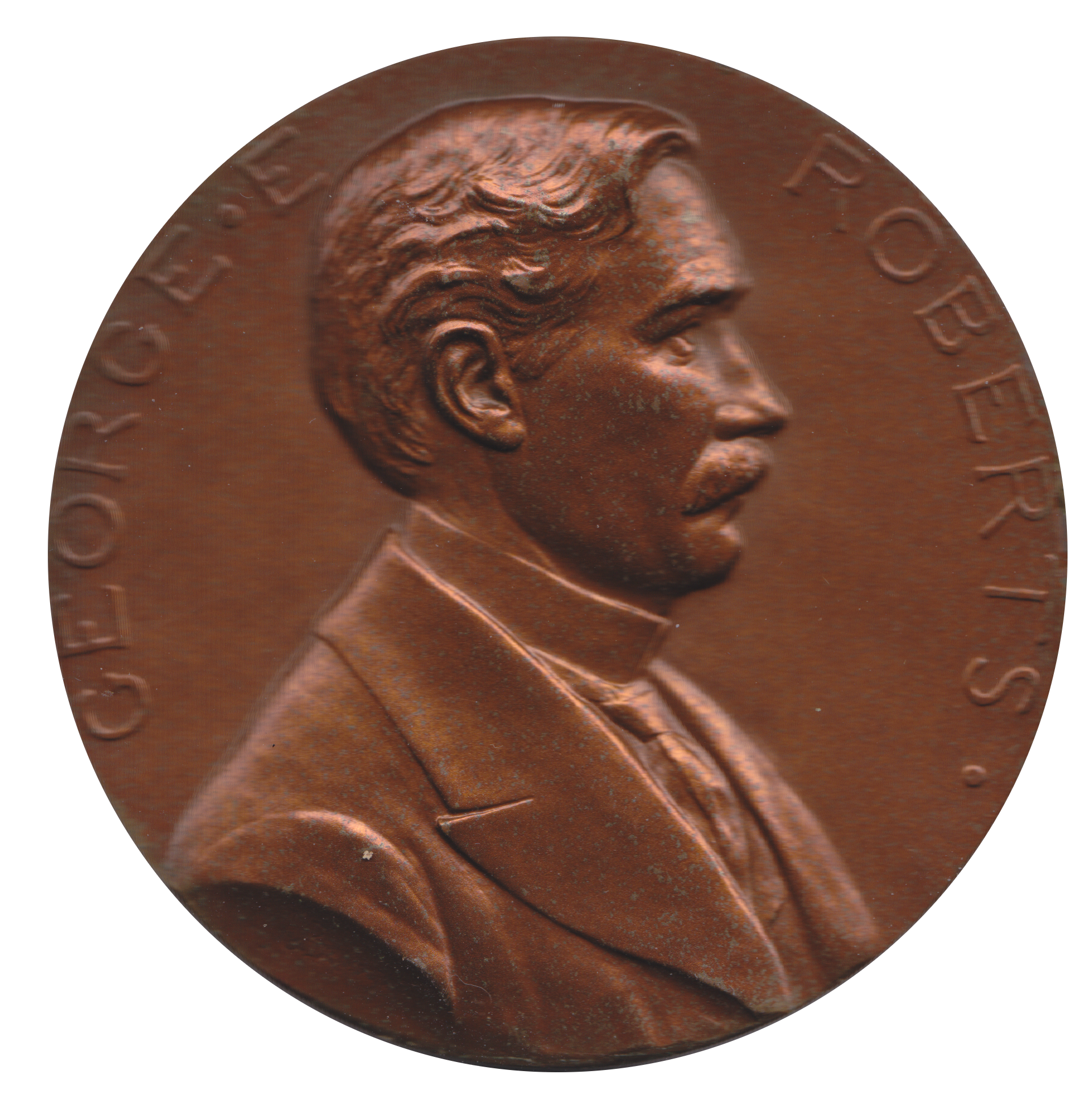
Mint Director George E. Roberts on his Mint medal designed by Chief Engraver Charles E. Barber

Once the bill passed, Bureau of the Mint Chief Engraver Charles E. Barber took personal charge of the project, seeking to avoid the delays and disputes that had marked the two previous commemoratives, the Columbian half dollar and the Isabella quarter. On March 24, 1899, Mint Director George E. Roberts wrote in a letter that the Lafayette Memorial Commission was contemplating having, on one side of the coin, a representation of the new monument. Barber responded the following day to Philadelphia Mint Superintendent Henry Boyer, referencing that letter and asking for a sketch of the monument.

By April 12, 1899, the chief engraver had obtained from commission secretary Thompson a preliminary sketch of the monument—an equestrian statue by Paul Bartlett. Barber sketched other designs, including one with Lafayette's 1784 prayer for the prosperity of the United States. He also created one showing a standing figure of Lafayette, based on a statement by Thompson that they might omit the horse. Barber's concepts showing an equestrian statue for one side, and jugate heads of Lafayette and Washington for the other, would form the basis for the eventual coin. Roberts quickly approved Barber's sketch of the two heads, and without consulting the commission leaked the information to the American Journal of Numismatics, which printed it in its April 1899 issue.

On May 23, 1899, Barber wrote to Roberts that he planned to base the Washington bust (on the obverse) on the well-known 1785 bust of the first president by Jean-Antoine Houdon, and upon an early medallic use of the Houdon bust, the 1786 "Washington Before Boston" medal by Pierre-Simon-Benjamin Duvivier. The Lafayette bust (also on the obverse) was to be based on an 1824 medal of Lafayette by François-Augustin Caunois.

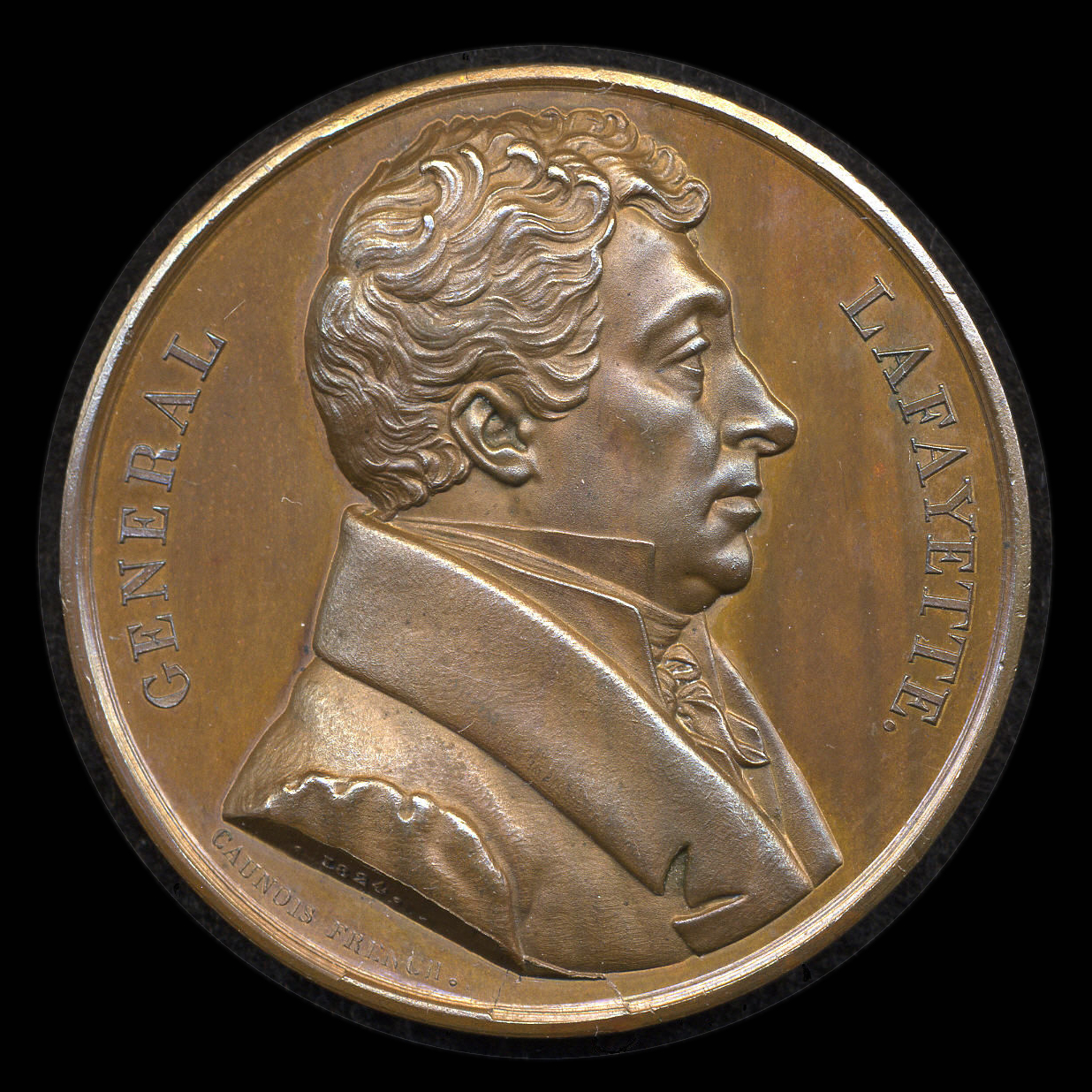
Caunois's medal of Lafayette

Peck and other commission members were not satisfied with the design proposals, and suggested some of their own. Barber denigrated these in a letter to Roberts on June 8. Peck had proposed that only the faces of Washington and Lafayette be shown, with no depiction of the rest of the head. Barber stated, "I am of the opinion that the heads of Washington and Lafayette should be treated from the sculptor's standpoint, and every effort be made to represent them with a grandeur and dignity commensurate with the position they fill in the Nation's history, which certainly could not be done if they are to be shown peeping out of a half moon." At the instructions of Roberts, Barber went to New York and met with Peck over two days on June 14 and 15. Afterwards, Barber reported to the Mint Director, "I think we will hear no more of the Lafayette prayer" and that Peck now appreciated that the space available for a design, even on a silver dollar (the largest US coin) was limited, "and as it is the desire of the Committee [commission] to have the monument displayed, the prayer will have to find some other place". Although Barber indicated that the decision of the commission to represent the statue without its pedestal represented progress toward the point where he might engrave dies, "I learned in New York that the work of the sculptor must be submitted to a committee in Paris who will have entire charge of the monument, and the sculptor's work has to be changed in any and every detail until it meets the approval of this Committee of Frenchmen ... to me it looks as if it might be sometime in 1900."

On June 20, 1899, Barber submitted the final designs for the coin. They were approved by Director Roberts on July 1. This did not put an end to the wrangles over what should be on the coin: the commission wished to have the coins dated 1900, but have them to sell as early as possible in 1899. Secretary of the Treasury Lyman Gage insisted on the provision of the Coinage Act of 1873 that required the date of production to appear on the coins. In the end, the matter was compromised: the pieces were struck in December 1899, not distributed until the following month, and the inscription "Paris 1900" appears on the coins.

== Design ==
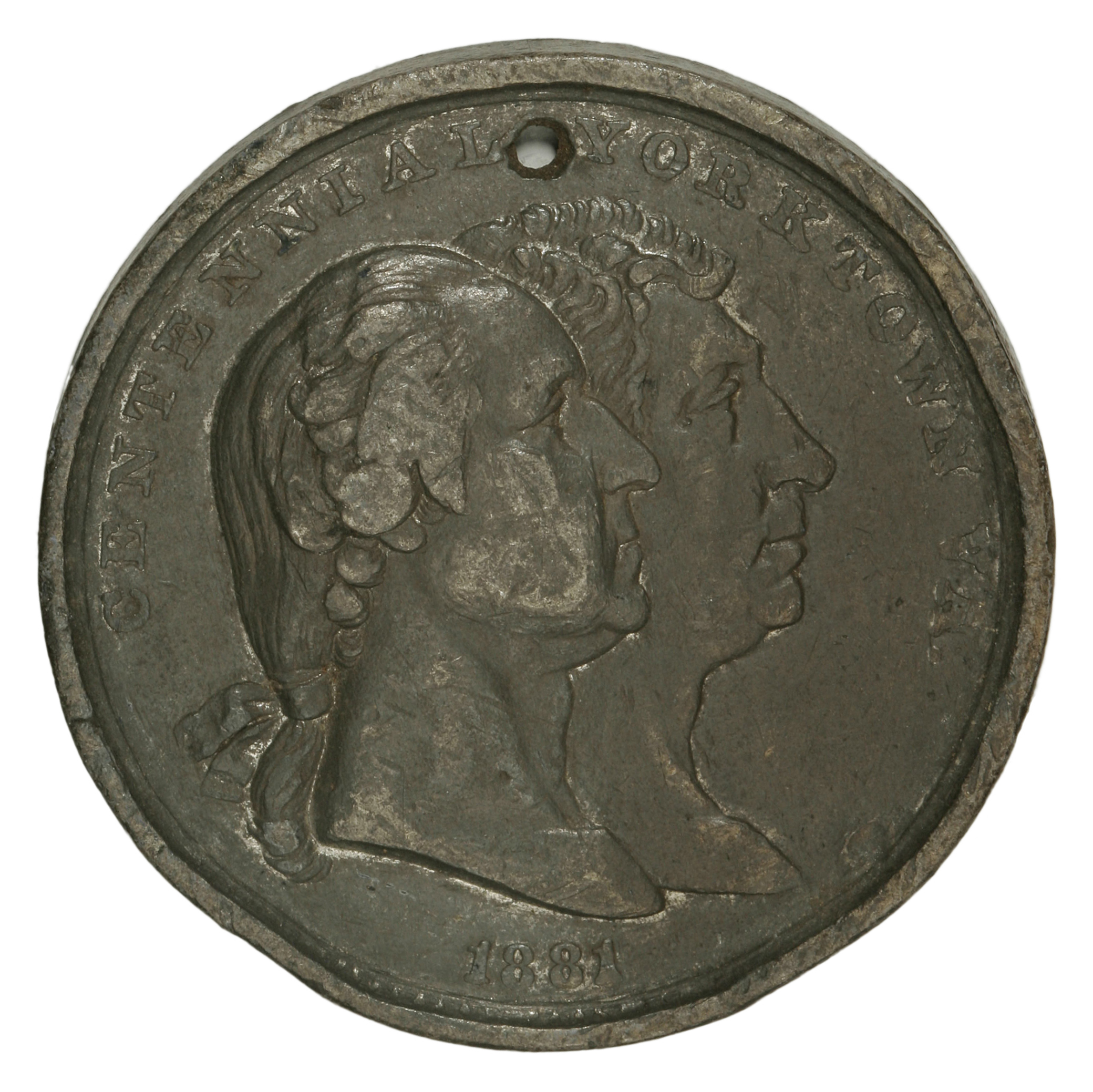
Peter Krider's Yorktown Centennial medal (1881)

The obverse of the Lafayette dollar features jugate, or conjoined, heads of Washington and Lafayette. Slabaugh noted Barber's account that the busts were based on the sculpture by Houdon and the medal by Caunois, but, "possibly these did have some effect on the design but it has always been my belief that the immediate source or idea for the design was the Yorktown Centennial medal of 1881." Swiatek and Breen contended that although the ultimate ancestor of Barber's depiction of Washington was the Houdon bust, the source of the Lafayette bust and the format of the obverse "was beyond doubt Peter L. Krider's Yorktown Centennial Medal (1881)". Krider, a Philadelphia engraver not employed by the Mint, issued a number of tokens and medals in the 1870s and 1880s. "United States of America" and "Lafayette Dollar" appear at the top and bottom of the obverse of the coin.

The reverse is based on an early sketch of the statue of Lafayette by Bartlett. It depicts a mounted statue of Lafayette, riding left. Barber's monogram does not appear on the coin, but the name "Bartlett" is inscribed on the base of the statue. Also on the base, and extending below it, is a palm branch. The reverse inscription, "Erected by the youth of the United States in honor of Gen Lafayette/Paris 1900" is a tribute to the school fundraising efforts that took place in 1898. Swiatek and Breen pointed out that even if one grants that the 1900 date was intended to be that of the exposition and the erection of the statue, the coins would still violate the 1873 act, that required the date of mintage to appear on the coins, and thus "the Lafayette dollars are technically undated and therefore illegal!"

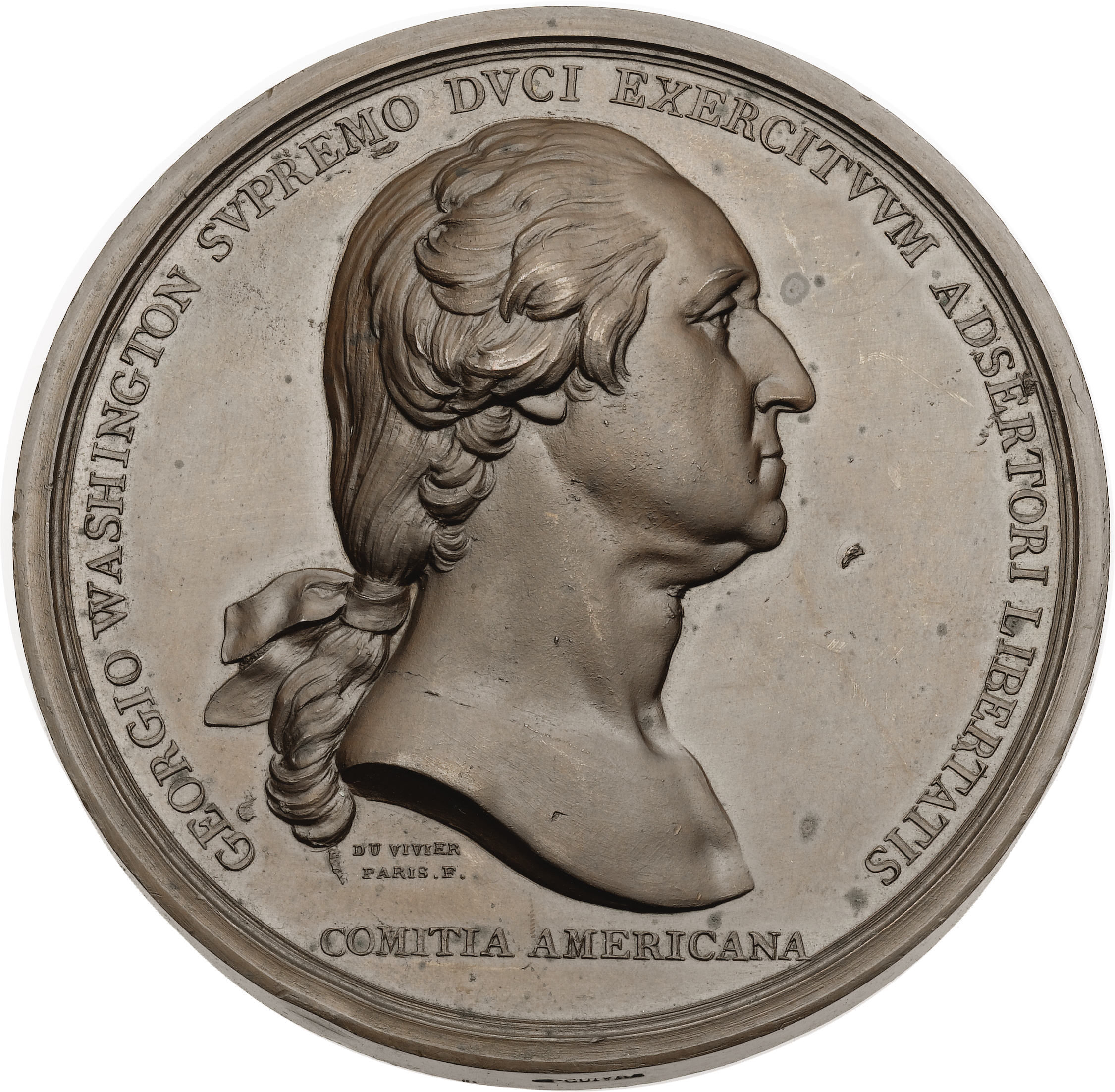
The obverse of the "Washington Before Boston" medal was the first medallic use of Houdon's bust.

On the reverse, Lafayette holds a sword, extended upwards. Bartlett described the version of the statue that Barber worked from: "Lafayette is represented in the statue as a fact and a symbol, offering his sword and services to the American colonists in the cause of liberty. He appears as the emblem of the aristocratic and enthusiastic sympathy shown by France to our forefathers." Swiatek and Breen noted, "We may take Lafayette's pose on the statue, as depicted on the coin, to represent him in triumphal procession rather than charging against the enemy—note his sheathed sword, like a Highland pipe major's baton, serving as a standard rather than brandished unsheathed as a weapon."

Barber's design for the Lafayette dollar has often been criticized. Swiatek and Breen complained about the "lifeless head of the President [Washington]". Q. David Bowers stated that "the shallow relief of Barber's work is but a travesty of Krider's extremely detailed high-relief artistry". According to Don Taxay, "When one compares Barber's portraits to those by Du Vivier [sic] and Caunois, it is clear why [sculptor and Barber enemy] Saint-Gaudens used to refer contemptuously to the 'commercial medalists of the Mint'. The difference here is not merely in the relief, but in elementary modeling skill." Art historian Cornelius Vermeule stated that, "the Lafayette dollar lacks the quaint, dated appeal of the Isabella quarter or the amusing originality of the Columbian half-dollar. Despite the necessity for low relief the jugate busts are too linear. The reverse suffers from too much lettering of uniform size. The words 'Paris 1900' might have been enough; at most, the addition of 'From the Youth of the United States' would have conveyed the matter."

== Production and aftermath ==
All Lafayette dollars were struck at the Philadelphia Mint on December 14, 1899, the centennial of the death of George Washington. The Philadelphia Public Ledger reported,

Present at this small Lafayette dollar ceremony were several Mint officials, members of the Lafayette Memorial Commission and a few members of the press. After Miss Gleary [the coining press operator] removed the first Lafayette dollar struck, she presented it to Mint Superintendent Henry Boyer. Mint Chief Engraver Charles E. Barber then inspected it. It was then shown to Robert J. Thompson, secretary of the Memorial Commission, and then given to Director of the Mint George E. Roberts. It was placed in a coin or medal case and brought back to Washington, D.C., by Mr. Roberts, to be given to President William McKinley. The coin was then to be sent in an elaborate $1,000 presentation case, to be given to the president of the French Republic.

Once the ceremony at the Philadelphia Mint had concluded, striking of the Lafayette dollar continued on an older coinage press capable of minting eighty pieces per minute, or 4,800 per hour. A total of 50,026 pieces were struck, including 26 coins laid aside for inspection and testing at the 1900 meeting of the United States Assay Commission.

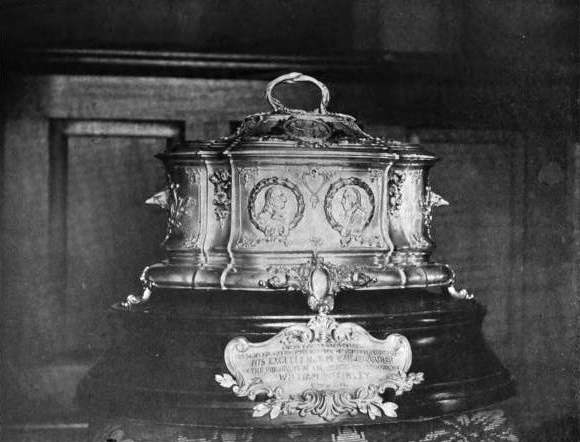
Casket in which the first Lafayette dollar was presented to French President Émile Loubet.

The first Columbian half dollar had been sold for $10,000. An offer of $5,000 was made but declined for the first Lafayette dollar to be struck, which was designated for presentation to the French president. Thompson, designated a special commissioner of the United States for the purpose, took the casket to France aboard the S.S. La Champagne. The ceremony was originally scheduled for February 22, 1900 (Washington's Birthday), but was not held until March 3, when Thompson presented the casket and coin to French President Émile Loubet. The two objects are now in the Louvre.

The commission was plagued by a number of financial difficulties. In January 1900, sculptor Charles Henry Niehaus questioned why $150,000 was the fundraising target of the commission, as no equestrian statue had ever cost more than half that. The commission was sued by architect Henry Hornbostel, demanding fees for designing a pedestal for Bartlett's statue. The out-of-court settlement reimbursed him for his expenses.

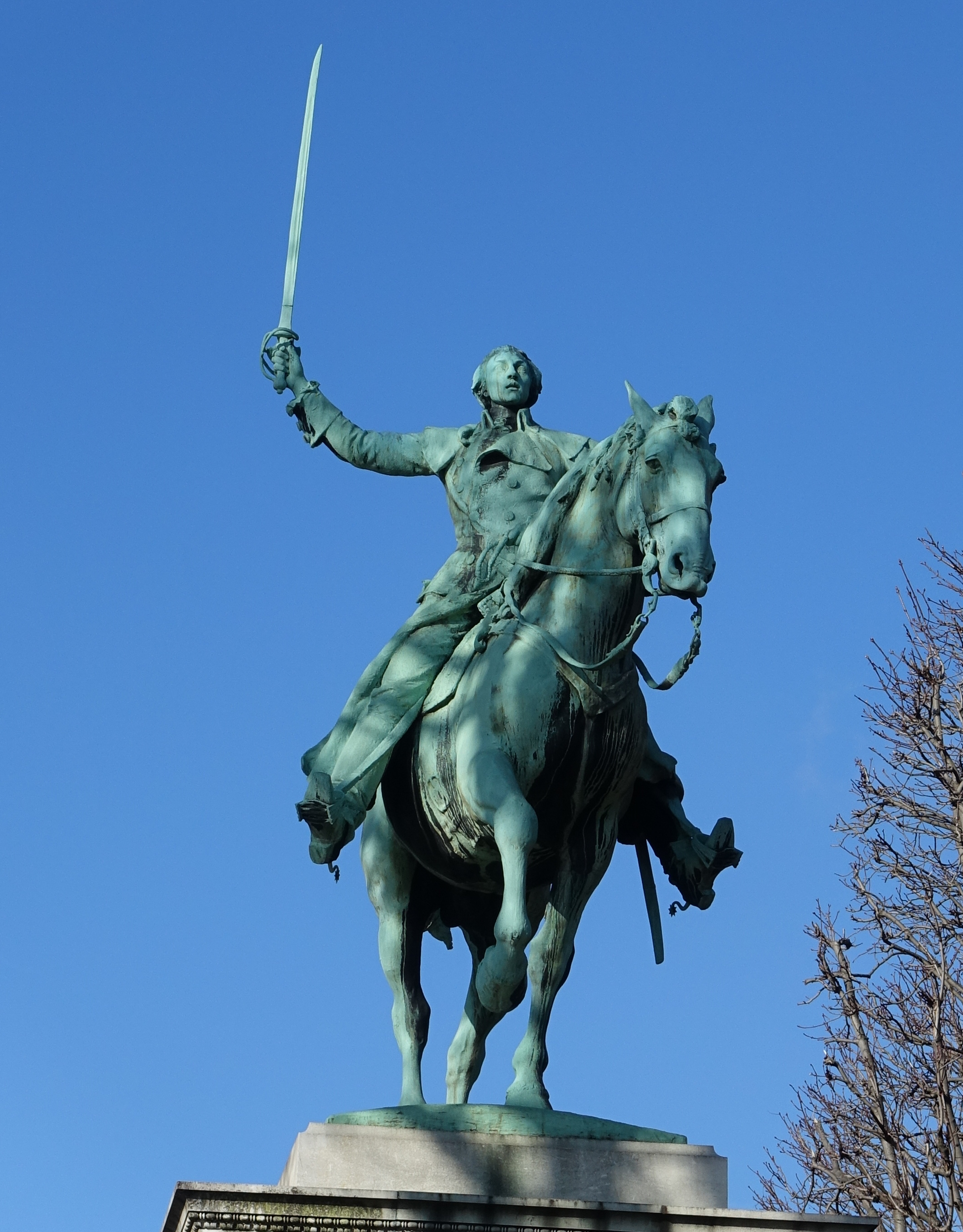
Paul Bartlett's statue of Lafayette in Paris

The commission was tardy in giving the final order for the statue to Bartlett, so late that it was impossible to have the final bronze piece ready in time; a one-third model was only completed in May. According to Q. David Bowers, "the French are at home in such problems." The commission was able to have a full-sized plaster model ready by July 4 by sawing the scale model in pieces and distributing them to various workshops, that made enlargements in plaster. Brought together, the plaster pieces fitted perfectly. This assembly was ceremoniously dedicated in the Place du Carrousel on July 4, 1900. Afterwards, Bartlett was dissatisfied with certain aspects of the design, and changed them. His bronze statue erected there in 1908 differs considerably from the statue depicted on the coin. Changes made included the elimination of Lafayette's three-cornered hat, and the position of the raised arm and sword. The statue stood there for almost eighty years, but was displaced in the 1980s during the excavations for I. M. Pei's glass pyramid at the Louvre. It now stands on Cours-la-Reine in Paris, along the River Seine.

Once the coins were minted, the commission began sales at $2 each. After February 1900, when the commission moved its offices from Chicago to Paris, sales were handled by the American Trust & Savings Bank of Chicago. Only small numbers were sold to coin collectors. Sales, conducted through the bank, continued for several years. Prices initially dropped on the secondary market—the pieces could be purchased for $1.10 in 1903—and thousands may have been released into circulation, or were spent by purchasers in hard times. By 1920, the market price passed the original issue price, and thereafter prices rose steadily, reaching $3.50 by 1930, $5 at the height of the commemorative coin boom in July 1936, $13 by 1950, $55 by 1960, and $650 by 1975.

Fourteen thousand pieces were returned to the Treasury, and were held in $1,000 sacks. This followed poor sales of the new coin in Paris—only 1,800 sold there; some 10,000 were returned to the United States. They were held for many years. In 1945, Omaha coin dealer Aubrey Beebe learned about the coins from government records and enquired, only to be told that the coins had been recently melted.

The Lafayette dollar is the first American coin to depict a US citizen. After the Lafayette piece, the Mint did not again strike a commemorative silver dollar until the 1983-S Los Angeles Olympics dollar.

== Collecting ==
In 1925, numismatist George H. Clapp discovered a Lafayette dollar that slightly differed from published descriptions. He researched the matter further over the following decade, and discovered two additional varieties. These exist because multiple dies, for both obverse and reverse, were used in striking the Lafayette piece, and the dies were not identical. Swiatek, writing in 2012, noted a fifth die combination he had discovered, and examined images of hundreds of Lafayette dollars he owned or that were on the Internet. He reported that two varieties combined for more than 90% of the specimens, with the remaining ones much rarer. Because of this, he speculated that the dollars were struck on at least two machines, not one as usually reported, with the rarer varieties the result of replacement dies being inserted as the original ones wore out. The differences are minor (for example, whether the M in "America" is raised or even with the A that precedes it on the obverse, and details of the palm branch on the reverse) and the coin is rarely collected by die type, meaning that little premium value attaches to the less common varieties.

R.S. Yeoman's deluxe edition of A Guide Book of United States Coins issued in 2018 lists the Lafayette dollar at $485 in Almost Uncirculated (AU-50) ranging upwards to $15,000 in near-pristine MS-66. One in MS-67 condition sold in 2015 for $73,438. Most Lafayette dollars display contact marks from other coins as the pieces were mechanically ejected from the press into a hopper and no attempt was made to preserve their appearance for collectors. Although whether the specimen is well-struck or not rarely affects value, clearly struck specimens will show the engraving line separating Lafayette's boot from the rest of his uniform, and details of the lower part of his clothing will also be distinct. The highest points on the coin, at which wear should be most apparent, are Washington's cheekbone on the obverse and the face of Lafayette on the reverse.

The coin has been counterfeited from time to time. Various techniques have also been used to make genuine specimens shinier to deceive collectors, including polishing, a process that damages their surfaces and patina.

== References and bibliography ==
Books

- Adams, John Quincy (1835). Oration on the Life and Character of Gilbert M. de Lafayette. Trenton, NJ: D. Fenton. OCLC 191237505 – via Google Books.
- Bowers, Q. David (1992). Commemorative Coins of the United States: A Complete Encyclopedia. Wolfeboro, NH: Bowers and Merena Galleries, Inc.
- Burdette, Roger W. (2006). Renaissance of American Coinage, 1905–1908. Great Falls, Va.: Seneca Mill Press. ISBN 978-0-9768986-1-0.
- Bureau of the Mint (1904). Laws of the United States Relating to the Coinage. Washington, DC: United States Government Printing Office. OCLC 8109299 – via Google Books.
- Field, Cynthia R.; Gournay, Isabelle; Somma, Thomas P. (2013). Paris on the Potomac: The French Influence on the Architecture and Art of Washington. Vol. 3. Athens, OH: Ohio University Press. ISBN 978-0-8214-4239-5 – via Google Books.
- Flynn, Kevin (2008). The Authoritative Reference on Commemorative Coins 1892–1954. Roswell, GA: Kyle Vick. OCLC 711779330.
- Lange, David W. (2006). History of the United States Mint and its Coinage. Atlanta, GA: Whitman Publishing. ISBN 978-0-7948-1972-9.
- Peck, Ferdinand W. (1901). Report of the Commissioner-General for the United States to the International Universal Exposition, Paris, France, 1900. Vol. 1. Washington, D.C.: United States Government Printing Office – via Google Books.
- Slabaugh, Arlie R. (1975). United States Commemorative Coinage (2nd ed.). Racine, WI: Whitman Publishing (then a division of Western Publishing Company, Inc.). ISBN 978-0-307-09377-6.
- Swiatek, Anthony (2012). Encyclopedia of the Commemorative Coins of the United States. Chicago: KWS Publishers. ISBN 978-0-9817736-7-4.
- Swiatek, Anthony & Breen, Walter (1981). The Encyclopedia of United States Silver & Gold Commemorative Coins, 1892 to 1954. New York: Arco Publishing. ISBN 978-0-668-04765-4.
- Taxay, Don (1967). An Illustrated History of U.S. Commemorative Coinage. New York: Arco Publishing. ISBN 978-0-668-01536-3.
- Vermeule, Cornelius (1971). Numismatic Art in America. Cambridge, MA: The Belknap Press of Harvard University Press. ISBN 978-0-674-62840-3.
- Yeoman, R.S. (2018). A Guide Book of United States Coins 2014 (4th ed.). Atlanta, GA: Whitman Publishing, LLC. ISBN 978-0-7948-4580-3.
