= Oliver Bosbyshell =

Superintendent of the Philadelphia Mint, 1889 to 1894

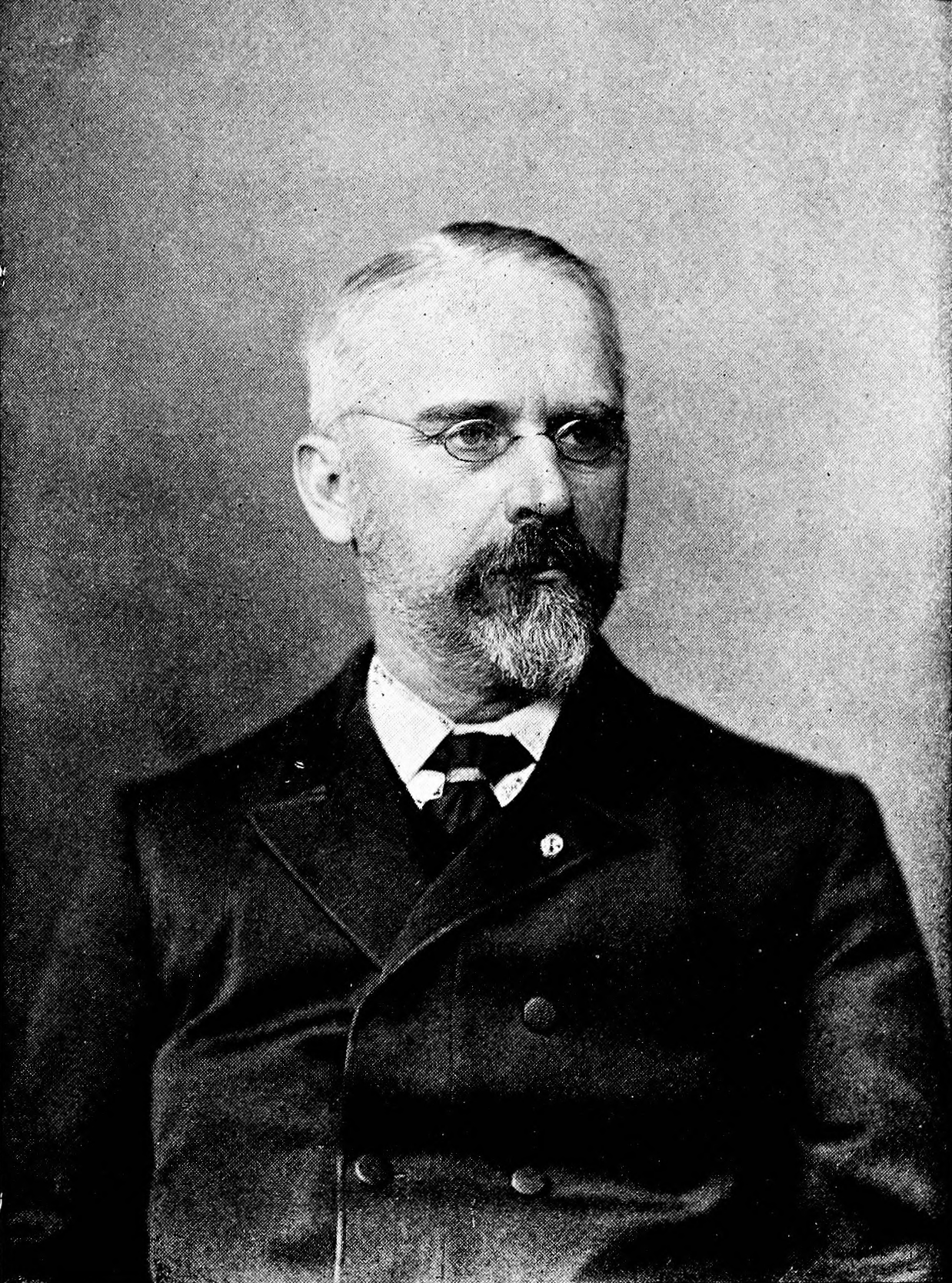

4th Superintendent of the United States Mint at Philadelphia
- In office November 1, 1889 – March 31, 1894
- President: Benjamin Harrison; Grover Cleveland
- Preceded by: Daniel M. Fox
- Succeeded by: Eugene Townsend

8th Chief Coiner of the United States Mint at Philadelphia
- In office December 15, 1876 – February 1885
- President: Ulysses S. Grant; Rutherford B. Hayes; James A. Garfield; Chester A. Arthur
- Preceded by: A. Loudon Snowden
- Succeeded by: William S. Steel

Member of the United States Assay Commission for 1898
- President: William McKinley

Personal details
- Born: Oliver Christian Bosbyshell; January 3, 1839 Vicksburg, Mississippi, U.S.
- Died: August 1, 1921 (aged 82) Philadelphia, Pennsylvania, U.S.
- Resting place: West Laurel Hill Cemetery, Bala Cynwyd, Pennsylvania
- Spouse: Martha Stem (m. 1863; died 1914)
- Children: 4

Military service
- Allegiance: United States
- Branch/service: Union Army
- Years of service: April 16, 1861 – October 1, 1864
- Rank: Major
- Unit: 25th Pennsylvania Volunteers; 48th Pennsylvania Volunteers
- Commands: 48th Pennsylvania (August–October 1864)
- Battles/wars: American Civil War; Second Battle of Bull Run; Battle of South Mountain; Battle of Antietam; Battle of Fredericksburg; Battle of Campbell's Station; Battle of the Crater

Oliver Christian Bosbyshell (January 3, 1839 – August 1, 1921) was Superintendent of the United States Mint at Philadelphia from 1889 to 1894. He claimed to have been the first Union soldier wounded by enemy action in the Civil War, stating that he received a bruise on the forehead from an object thrown by a Confederate sympathizer while his unit was marching through Baltimore in April 1861.

Bosbyshell was born in Mississippi of an old Philadelphia family, residing temporarily in the South, and raised in Schuylkill County, Pennsylvania. He enlisted in the Union cause on the outbreak of war. He served in the Union army during the American Civil War with the 25th Pennsylvania Volunteer Regiment for three months and then the 48th Pennsylvania Infantry for three years. He saw action in several key battles of the Eastern theater and was promoted to the rank of major. He led African American troops during the Battle of the Crater that suffered over 400 casualties.

After leaving the army, Bosbyshell became involved in Republican politics and the activities of the Grand Army of the Republic, a veterans' group. He was appointed to a post at the Philadelphia Mint in 1869, and was appointed as chief coiner in 1876 and superintendent in 1889, serving for four years. One of Bosbyshell's underlings at the mint stole gold bars and, as they were not all recovered when the culprit was arrested, Bosbyshell was held responsible for the loss by virtue of his office. He was absolved of this liability by act of Congress in 1899. In his later years, he was an officer of an insurance company.

== Early life and Civil War ==
Bosbyshell was born in Vicksburg, Mississippi, on January 3, 1839, the son of Oliver Christian and Mary Ann (Whitney) Bosbyshell. Both his parents were from old Philadelphia families; the couple had taken up temporary residence in Vicksburg. The senior Oliver Bosbyshell was engaged in the commission business. He contracted bronchitis while fighting a fire that destroyed his warehouse, and died in Philadelphia after a sea voyage taken in the hope of recovering his health. Eight weeks later, his son was born, and Mary Bosbyshell returned from Mississippi with him to her father's house in Schuylkill County, Pennsylvania. Young Oliver grew up there, and attended local public schools. At age 15, he left school to become a telegraph messenger and for the next three years took various jobs in that field before deciding to pursue a career in the law. He first studied with attorney Francis W. Hugbee, then with his uncle, William Whitney; both were in Pottsville. He was still engaged as a student in 1861, when the Civil War broke out.

On April 15, 1861, President Abraham Lincoln called for 50,000 volunteers to fight to preserve the Union. The following day, Bosbyshell joined the Washington Artillerists, a local militia company, which quickly set out for Washington. En route, the company had to march through the streets of Baltimore on April 17. A hostile crowd of Confederate sympathizers gathered; according to accounts in his lifetime, he was struck by a missile variously described as a stone or a brick. Although it gave him a large bruise and momentarily stunned him, the object drew no blood; Private Bosbyshell was purportedly the first man wounded in the Union cause, while an African-American servant, hit a few minutes later by a missile which broke the skin, was deemed the first man to have shed his blood for the Union. However, official records do not list Bosbyshell among the casualties of the Baltimore riots.

In Washington, the company was quartered in the Ladies' Gallery of the Senate Chamber, in the Capitol. The 350 Pennsylvania troops who first reached Washington on April 18 became known as the First Defenders and, after the war, the survivors formed an association with that name. While they were lodged at the Capitol, President Lincoln, Secretary of State William H. Seward, and Secretary of War Simon Cameron visited. Bosbyshell recalled Lincoln, "yes, here, towering over all in the room was the great central figure of the war. I remember how I was impressed by the kindliness of his face and awkward hanging of his arms and legs, his apparent bashfulness in the presence of these first soldiers of the Republic, and with it all a grave, rather mournful bearing in his attitude."

The Washington Artillerists were redesignated as Company H of the 25th Pennsylvania Volunteers, and were sent down the Potomac River to Fort Washington, where the company spent three months strengthening the fortifications. Bosbyshell was offered a first lieutenancy in the regular Army, which he declined, stating that he preferred volunteer service. When the company's term of enlistment expired, Bosbyshell rejoined Union forces as a second lieutenant in Company G, 48th Pennsylvania Volunteers, to serve a three-year term from October 1, 1861.

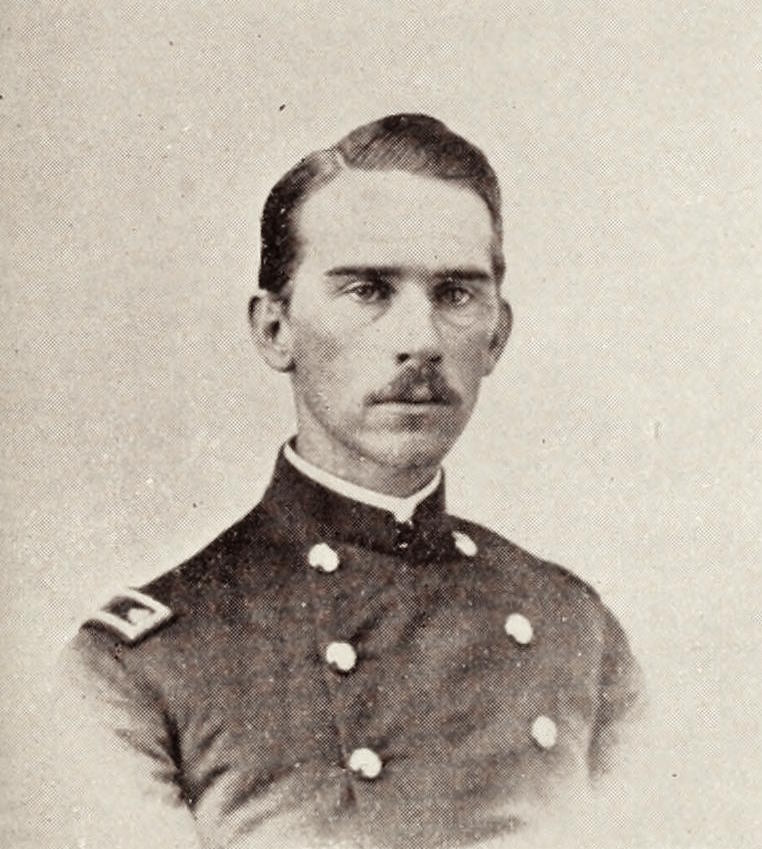
Major Oliver Bosbyshell

For about a month after his re-enlistment, Bosbyshell was regimental recruiting officer in Harrisburg, but on November 11, sailed with his regiment from Fortress Monroe, Virginia, to Hatteras, North Carolina. There he served as acting adjutant of his regiment, and as judge advocate for courts-martial. When General Ambrose Burnside launched an attack on New Bern, he took six companies of the 48th with him, as well as Bosbyshell, though Company G was not included among the Union forces. In April and May 1862, Bosbyshell received successive promotions to first lieutenant and captain and was assigned to command his company, which he did at such battles as Second Bull Run, Antietam, and Fredericksburg. After Fredericksburg, he was again assigned to serve in courts-martial; when the regiment was moved west in early 1863, Bosbyshell was assigned as provost marshal of Louisville, Kentucky. While stationed at Louisville, he returned home to Pennsylvania on leave of absence to marry Martha Stem, daughter of a minister.

When the regiment was ordered to Tennessee in September 1863 to take part in Union actions there, Bosbyshell was made Acting Assistant Adjutant-General for the First Brigade of the Ninth Corps, of which the 48th was part. He fought at Blue Springs and Campbell's Station, and took part in the siege of Knoxville. In 1864, he returned to Pennsylvania again to help bring the regiment up to strength. Returning to his brigade post, he commanded African-American troops in the Wilderness Campaign.

On July 10, 1864, Bosbyshell was promoted to major and ordered to command the 48th, though he remained at his brigade post temporarily. At this time, Union forces were besieging Petersburg, south of the Confederate capital, Richmond, Virginia. The acting commander of the 48th, Lieutenant Colonel Henry Pleasants, in civilian life a mining engineer, conceived the idea of digging under the Confederate lines and exploding a giant bomb. After weeks of preparation, the bomb was exploded on July 30, creating a huge pit in the ground and a hole in the Confederate lines. After initial shock, the Confederates rallied and repulsed the attempt to break the lines, aided by Union bungling. Bosbyshell led African-American troops into action in the Battle of the Crater; they suffered over 400 casualties. With Pleasants promoted to General Robert B. Potter's staff, Bosbyshell took command of the 48th on August 2, 1864.

Bosbyshell led his command at Globe Tavern and at Peebles's Farm. In September 1864, he sought leave of absence to return to Pennsylvania on personal business. When this was refused, and with his three-year term of service having expired, he was mustered out on October 1, 1864.

== Return to Pennsylvania ==
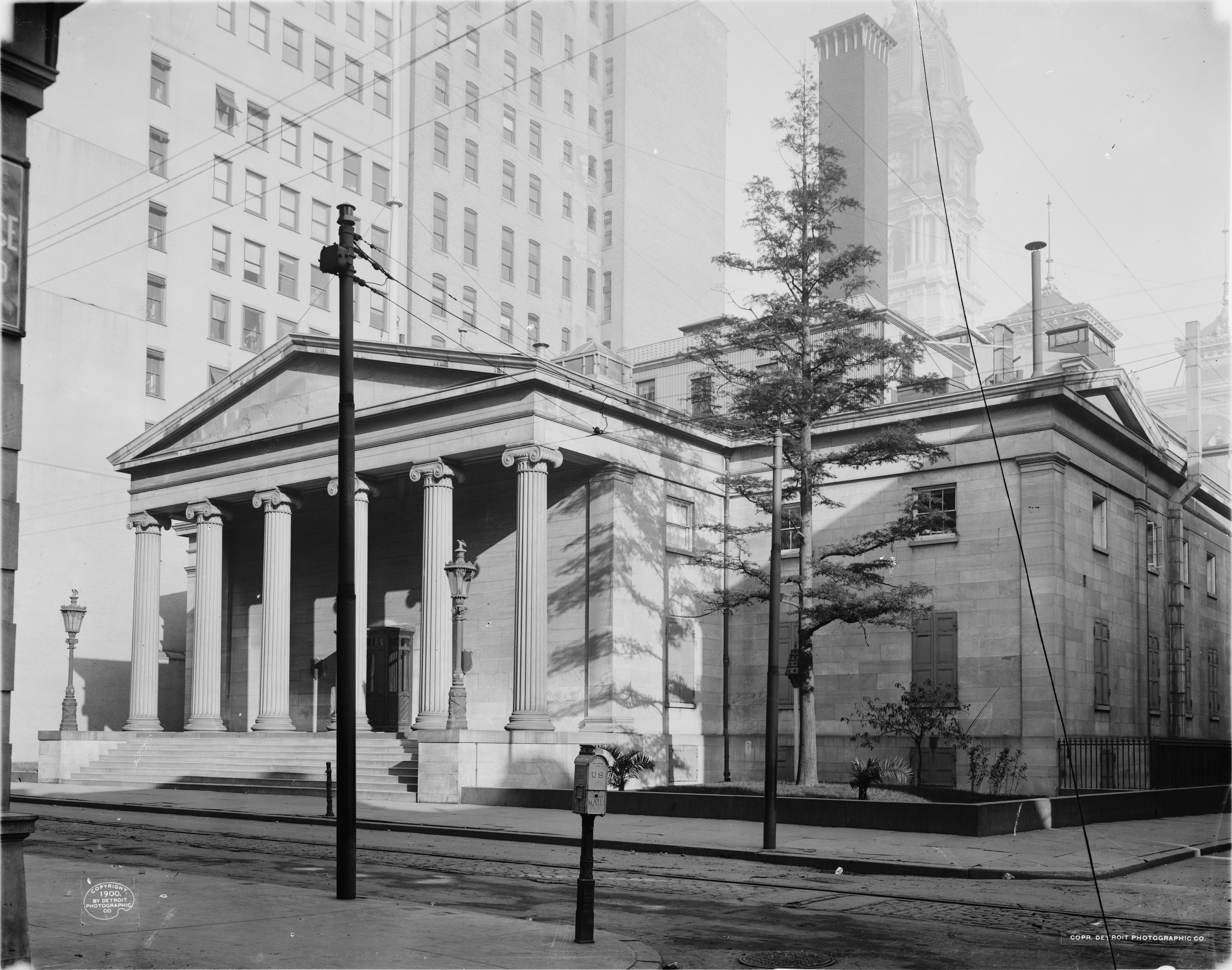
The second Philadelphia Mint (1833–1901)

Having returned to Pottsville, Bosbyshell entered first the banking business, and then the book and stationery trade, each time with "disastrous" results. A Republican, he ran for prothonotary of Schuylkill County in 1866, but was defeated.

Shortly after the war, the Grand Army of the Republic (GAR), a Union veteran's group, was founded. During Bosbyshell's campaign to become prothonotary, he was asked to organize the Schuylkill County branch, but declined because of his status as a candidate. The following year, however, he joined the GAR, organizing Post 24 in Pottsville. He became Schuylkill County district commander of the GAR soon after, and in 1869 was elected Pennsylvania's GAR department commander.

In 1869, Bosbyshell was hired as Register of Deposits of the Philadelphia Mint, and moved to that city. The Chief Coiner, A. Loudon Snowden, was impressed by Bosbyshell, and promoted him to Assistant Coiner in 1872. When Snowden left the Mint to accept a position as postmaster in 1876, President Ulysses Grant promoted Bosbyshell in his place. Grant nominated Bosbyshell on December 14, 1876; he was confirmed by the Senate on December 26. According to numismatic historian Q. David Bowers, Bosbyshell, while serving as Chief Coiner, used Mint facilities and out-of-date dies to strike rare three-dollar pieces, including the 1873, 1875, and 1876 issues. During Bosbyshell's tenure, quantities of pattern coins, restrikes, and pieces struck in different metals flowed to well-connected collectors and dealers, and Bosbyshell sold a large personal collection of such pieces shortly after leaving office.

Bosbyshell served as Chief Coiner until early 1885; with the approaching advent of the first Cleveland administration, Democrats would be appointed as Mint officials, and Bosbyshell secured a position as chief clerk in the Philadelphia City Controller's office. Bosbyshell was hired, despite the fact that he was a Republican in a Democratic-run municipal administration, because of his friendship with Controller Robert Dechert.

Having maintained his involvement in the GAR, Bosbyshell was in charge of the committee on arrangements for the Tenth National Encampment of the GAR, at Philadelphia in 1876. In 1879, he was elected as commander of Post 2 in that city. He also joined the Second Regiment of the Pennsylvania National Guard, and was elected major in 1878 and lieutenant colonel in 1880.

== Mint superintendent (1889–1894) ==
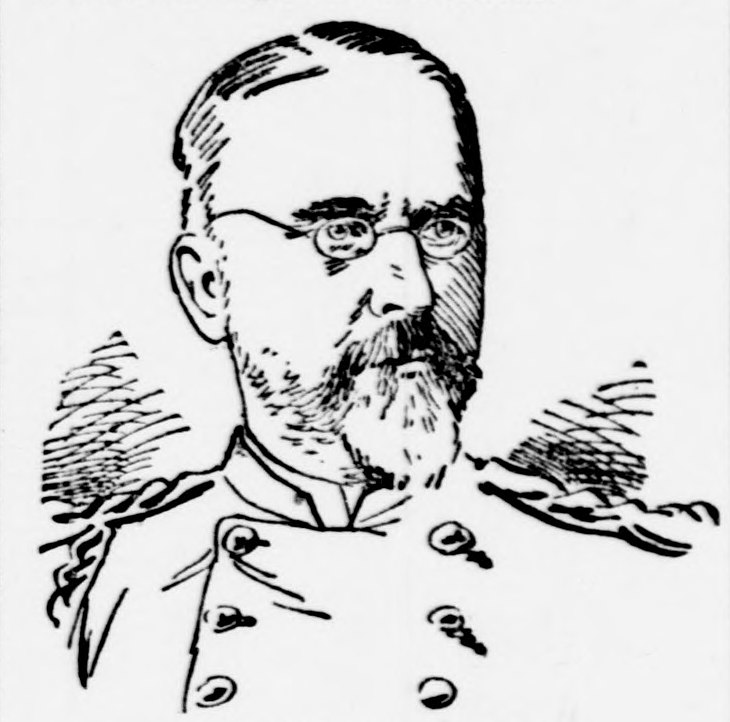
1893 woodcut of Bosbyshell in National Guard uniform

On October 17, 1889, President Benjamin Harrison commissioned Bosbyshell as superintendent of the Philadelphia Mint. As the Senate was not sitting, Bosbyshell received a recess appointment. Bosbyshell filed his oath of office on November 1, 1889. On his first day on the job, he was greeted with a bouquet of flowers and a large pile of mail from office-seekers. He gave receipts for the Mint property he was now responsible for, and found no errors in the accounts of his predecessor. On December 16, 1889, with the Senate in session, Harrison nominated Bosbyshell. The following day, Vermont Senator Justin Morrill, on behalf of the Senate Finance Committee, to which Bosbyshell's nomination had been referred, recommended that he be confirmed. The Senate did so on December 19.

In 1890, Bosbyshell deposited $4,200 of federal funds in the Keystone National Bank, which then went bankrupt. Bosbyshell was responsible for the debt, which was only $300 less than his annual salary, and paid it off by stages, completing the payments in 1894. In August 1890, Bosbyshell was elected colonel of his National Guard regiment; the vote was unexpectedly close, as he was disliked by some of his fellow officers. Following the Homestead Riots in July 1892, Pennsylvania Governor Robert E. Pattison ordered militia to the strike-torn town to restore order. Bosbyshell led his guard regiment to Homestead, where the strikers offered no resistance. In August 1893, he resigned from the regiment.

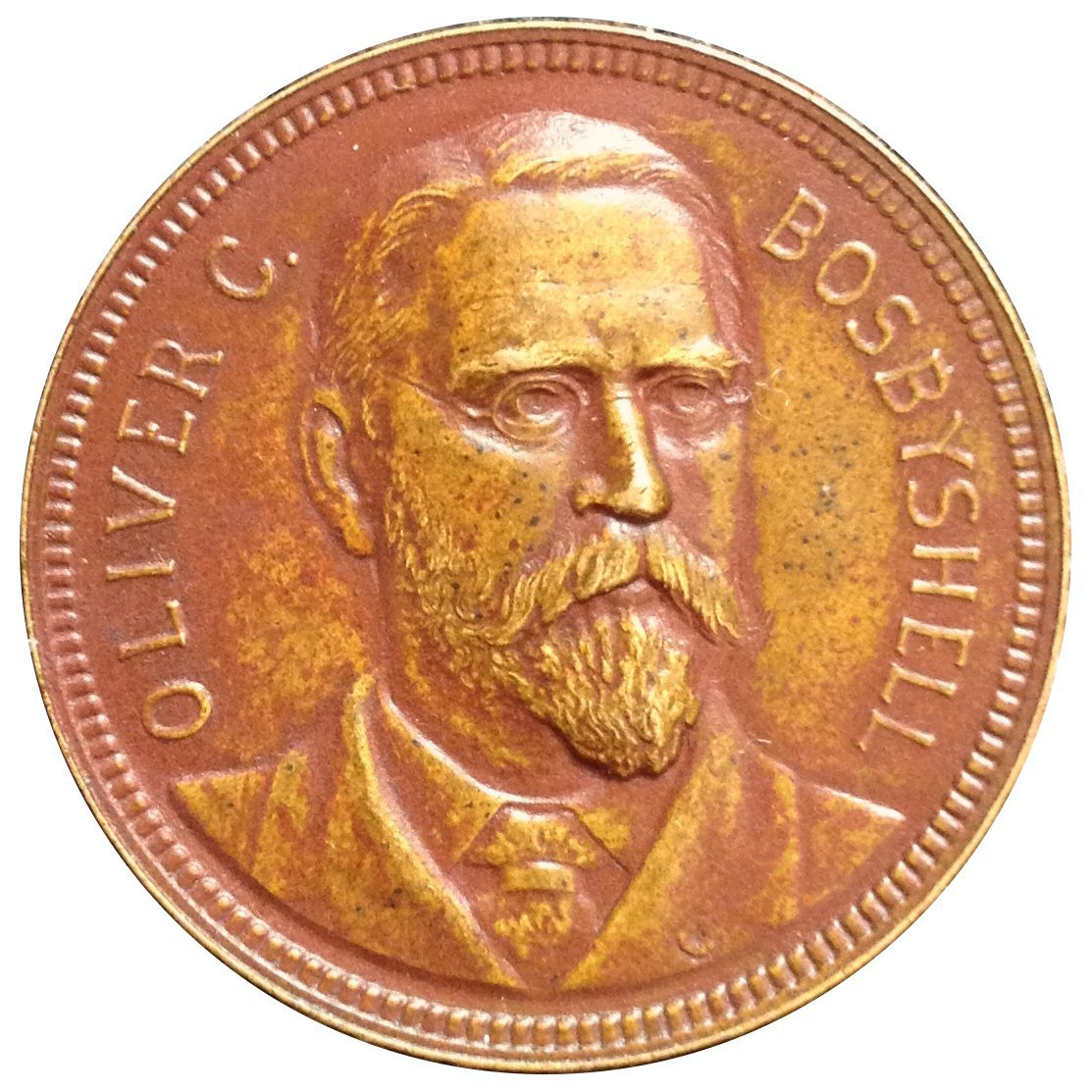
Bosbyshell on a medal, designed by Assistant Engraver George T. Morgan

Before Congress abolished the practice in 1873, the government made silver legal tender alongside gold. This led to one of the great political controversies of the late 1800s, as many called for a return to pre-1873 laws, which would require the government to take all the silver offered it and then return it, struck into silver dollars. On January 3, 1891, two "free silver" advocates called at the Philadelphia Mint with a large ingot of silver, and asked for it to be coined. When the weighing clerk declined, they asked to see Bosbyshell, who received them, but refused their demand. He did, however, write at their request a letter stating that the laws forbade coinage of silver provided by the public.

Bosbyshell was Mint Superintendent while the Mint created new coin designs, including the Barber coinage, Columbian half dollar, and Isabella quarter. In the case of the quarter, issued in 1893, Bosbyshell was involved in the consultations within the Mint over the design, and sent a letter to Caroline Peddle, who was initially hired to design the piece, requiring that the image of Queen Isabella on the coin not wear a crown. Soon after, Peddle withdrew from the project.

Cleveland was elected for a second non-consecutive term in November 1892. With the Democrats in power again, new Mint Director Robert Preston in late March 1894 ordered Bosbyshell to turn over the Philadelphia Mint to his successor, Dr. Eugene Townsend. This required the counting of every coin in the facility, including cents and nickels. After consulting with the sureties on his bond as superintendent, Bosbyshell objected to resigning until the count (expected to take three months) was complete, but nevertheless left office as directed on March 31, 1894.

== Later years, interests, and death ==
Bosbyshell had been elected vice-president of the Fidelity National Life Insurance Company in February 1893; in December of that year he was elected treasurer instead, a post he still held as of 1908. President McKinley appointed him a member of the 1898 Assay Commission.

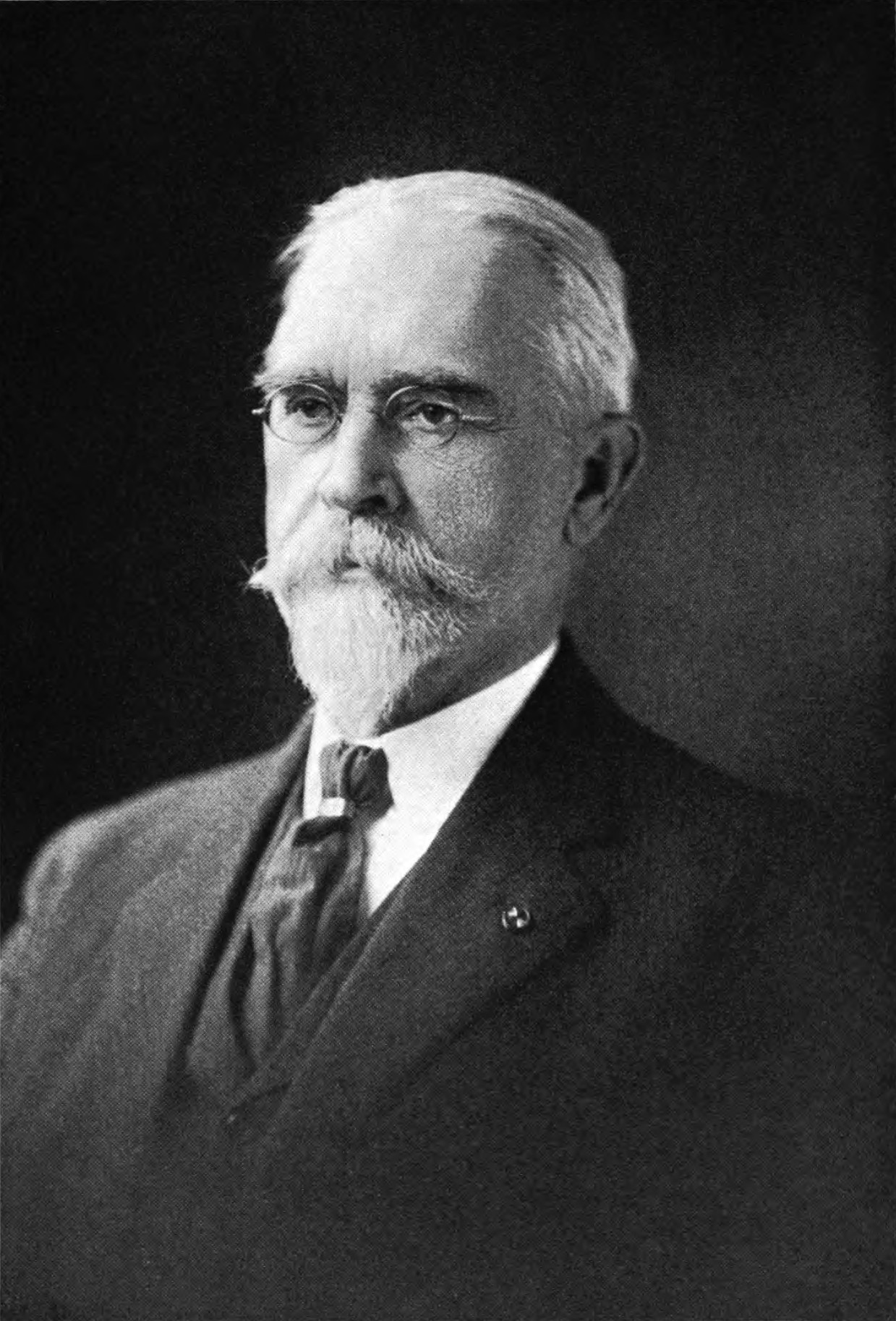
Bosbyshell in his later years

In September 1893, a major theft at the Philadelphia Mint had been discovered. Henry Cochran, weighing clerk, had been surreptitiously extracting gold bars from a vault sealed in 1887, not with a solid door but with a latticed one that was somewhat loose. Bosbyshell, in taking custody of the Philadelphia Mint's assets from his predecessor, Daniel Fox, had not asked for the gold to be weighed. When the gold was taken out to be converted into coin in 1893, the shortage was discovered. Although some of the gold was recovered, there was still a shortage of $12,810.82, and the government brought suit against Bosbyshell after he left office in 1894, securing judgment against him and the sureties on his bond. Bosbyshell appealed to the United States Court of Appeals for the Third Circuit, which ruled against him. The district court had ruled for Bosbyshell on the matter of 733 silver dollars said to be missing, leaving only the question of the gold. Bosbyshell asked for review by the Supreme Court, but also sought legislative relief, and on February 2, 1899, Congress absolved him of the debt, making the court case moot.

With the outbreak of the Spanish–American War in 1898, Bosbyshell organized and served as colonel of the Nineteenth Pennsylvania National Guard Regiment, which was used for homeland defense. He remained in that capacity from August 1898 until November 1899.

As well as the GAR, Bosbyshell had many interests and activities. An Episcopalian, he was a vestryman of the Church of the Savior in Philadelphia; for many years he conducted the choir and involved himself in Sunday school work, often as superintendent. He memorialized his regiment's wartime experiences with The 48th in the War, published in 1895, and was a member of several other veterans societies. He was also chairman of the Board of Trustees of the University Lodge of Masons. Taking an interest in genealogy, around 1910 he published Descendants of Christian and Elizabeth (Oliver) Bosbyshell 1782–1910.

Oliver Bosbyshell died on August 1, 1921, after suffering a stroke. He was interred at West Laurel Hill Cemetery in Bala Cynwyd, Pennsylvania. He was survived by one of his children, Oliver, and by several grandchildren. He had four sons with his wife Martha, who died in 1914; their eldest son Nathan died in Los Angeles in 1888 at age 23.
