= Columbian half dollar =

United States commemorative coin

- United States
- Value: 50 cents (0.50 US dollars)
- Mass: 12.5 g
- Diameter: 30.61 mm (1.20 in)
- Thickness: 2.15 mm (0.08 in)
- Edge: Reeded
- Composition: 90.0% silver; 10.0% copper
- Silver: 0.36169 troy oz
- Years of minting: 1892–1893
- Mint marks: None (all struck at the Philadelphia Mint without mint mark)

Obverse
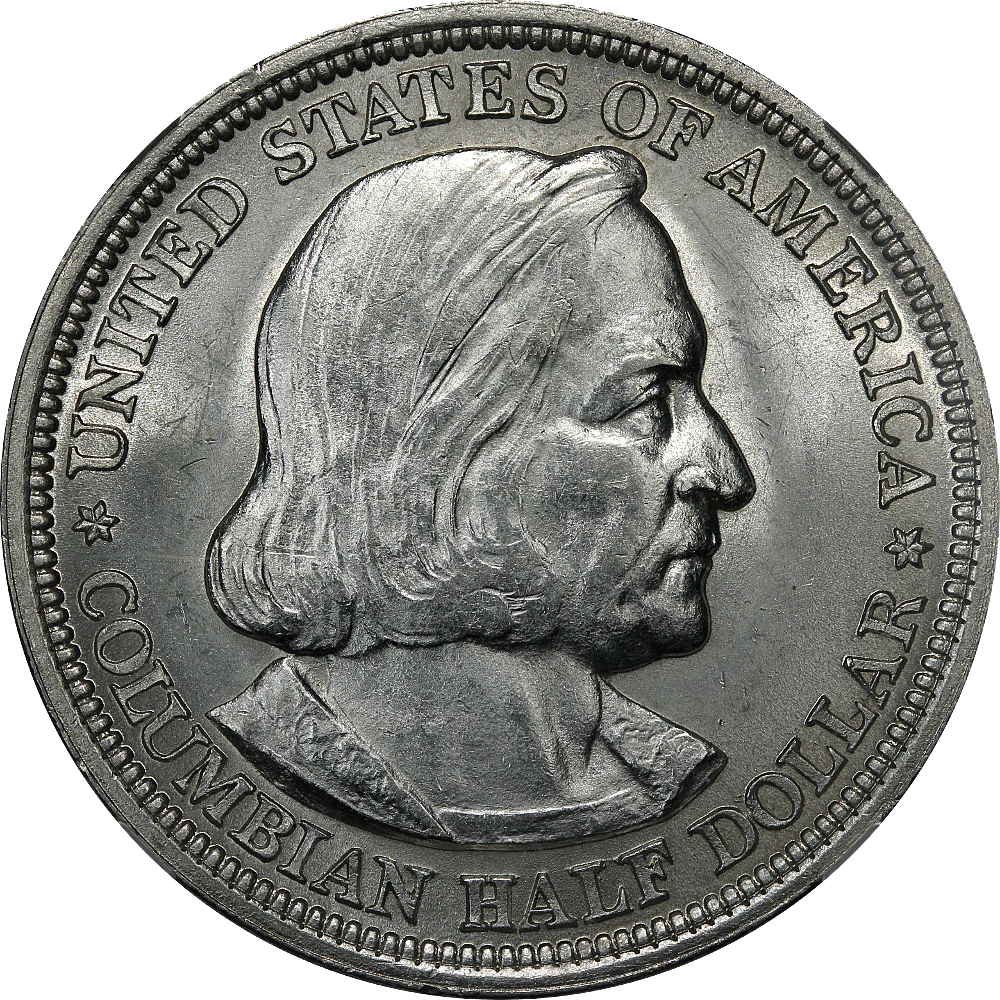
- Design: Right-facing portrait of Christopher Columbus flanked by the words "United States of America" and "Columbian Half Dollar".
- Designer: Charles E. Barber, after a concept by Olin Levi Warner
- Design date: 1892

Reverse
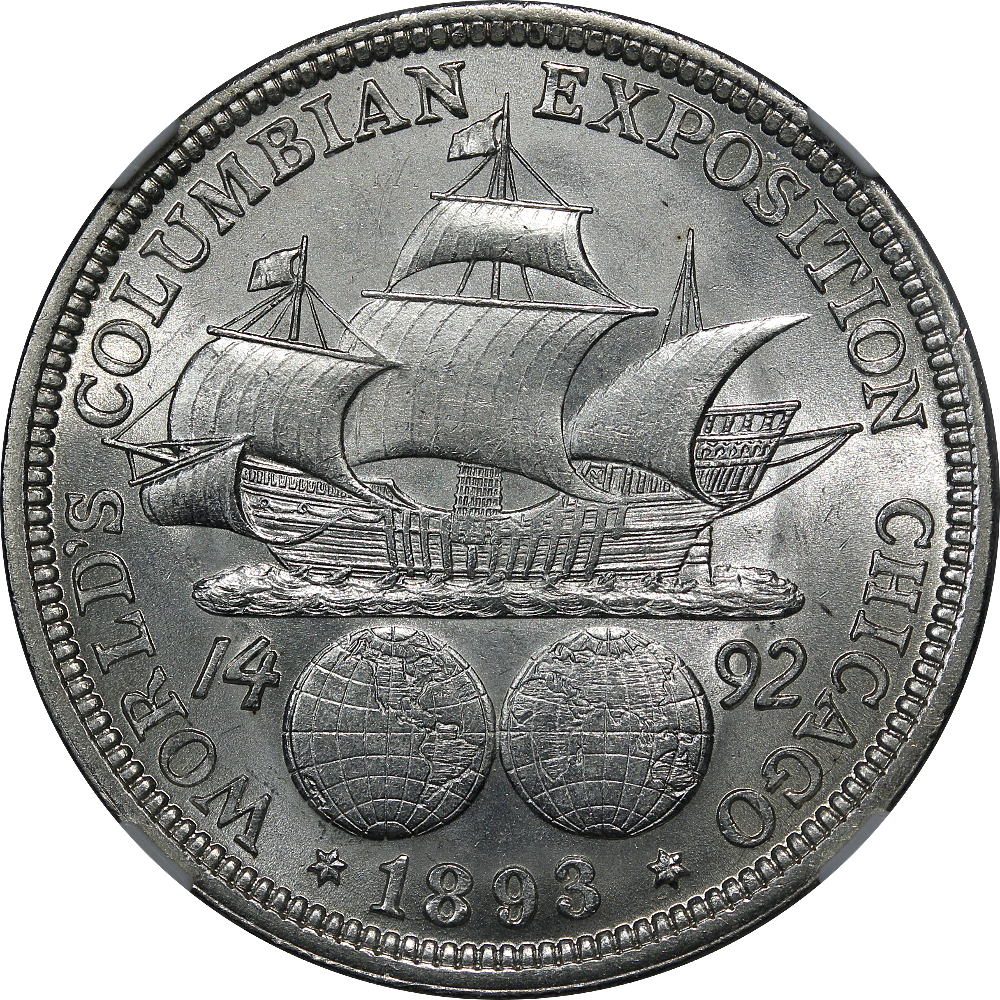
- Design: Port view of the Santa María above two hemispheres flanked by the date 1492. "World's Columbian Exposition Chicago" encircles the rim with the date of striking at bottom.
- Designer: George T. Morgan, after a concept by Olin Levi Warner
- Design date: 1892

The Columbian half dollar is a coin issued by the Bureau of the Mint in 1892 and 1893. The first traditional United States commemorative coin, it was issued both to raise funds for the 1893 World's Columbian Exposition and to mark the quadricentennial of the first voyage to the Americas of Christopher Columbus, whose portrait it bears. The Columbian half dollar was the first American coin to depict a historical person.

The coin stems from the desire of the Columbian Exposition's organizers to gain federal money to complete construction of the fair. Congress granted an appropriation, and allowed it to be in the form of commemorative half dollars, which legislators and organizers believed could be sold at a premium. Fair official James Ellsworth wanted the new coin to be based on a 16th-century painting he owned by Lorenzo Lotto, reputedly of Columbus, and pushed for this through the design process. When initial sketches by Mint Chief Engraver Charles E. Barber proved unsatisfactory, fair organizers turned to a design by artist Olin Levi Warner, which after modification by Barber and his assistant, George T. Morgan, was struck by the Mint.

Some 5,000,000 half dollars were struck, far beyond the actual demand, and half of them were melted. The appropriation did not cure the fair's financial woes, as fewer than 400,000 were sold at the premium price, and some 2,000,000 were released into circulation, where they remained as late as the 1950s. The pieces can be purchased in circulated condition for less than $20; coins in near-pristine state sell for about $1,000, far less than the $10,000 the makers of the Remington Typewriter paid as a publicity stunt in 1892 for the first specimen struck.

== Exposition ==
In 1890, Congress passed legislation giving federal sponsorship to an exposition to commemorate the 400th anniversary of the first voyage of Christopher Columbus to the New World. The act had established a World's Columbian Exposition Commission to oversee the fair. Leading citizens of Chicago established a World's Columbian Exposition Company ("the Company") to organize the construction, and the Company generally emerged as successful in the resulting infighting as to which group would be in charge. Had it not been for Daniel Burnham, head of the company's Board of Architects, the fair might never have been built. Burnham, whose favorite saying was, "Make no little plans; they have no magic to stir men's blood", became the czar of the exposition's construction.

An undeveloped site of 686 acres (278 ha) on the shores of Lake Michigan was selected for the fairgrounds. The buildings were in the classical style, reflecting Greek and Roman influences, and were composed of a combination of plaster of Paris and hemp called "staff" which resembled marble. President Benjamin Harrison invited "all the world" to take part; many foreign countries erected buildings, and every US state and territory was represented.

== Inception ==
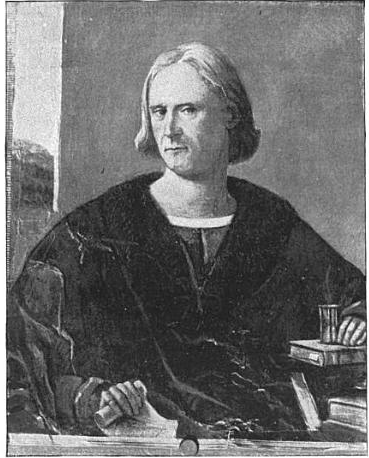
Reproduction of painting by Lorenzo Lotto, purportedly of Columbus, which served as the basis for the obverse of the half dollar

Efforts to promote a commemorative coin for the exposition began around January 1892. They were strongly advocated by the head of the company's Committee on Liberal Arts, James Ellsworth, who was particularly interested as he had recently purchased a 16th-century painting by Lorenzo Lotto of a learned man, said to be Columbus. Ellsworth wanted the portrait to be the basis of the coin. In this, he was advised by author and journalist William Eleroy Curtis, also a fair official. In April 1892, partisans had gained the support of the Director of the Bureau of the Mint, Edward O. Leech, who envisioned a coin carrying a visage of Columbus on one side, and a suitable inscription on the other. Curtis was well aware of the difficulties with the Mint's failed competition for new silver coins in 1891, which had led to the issuance of the Barber coinage, designed by Mint Chief Engraver Charles E. Barber. The new coins were widely criticized, and Curtis counseled Ellsworth to gain control of the commemorative coin's design process, to ensure both a better design and the use of the Lotto portrait. No United States coin had depicted an actual person, although the goddess of Liberty had often been portrayed.

By May 1892, it was apparent that additional funds were needed to complete the fair's buildings. The company had sold stock, and the City of Chicago had issued bonds to pay for the exposition, but the construction budgets had been greatly underestimated. The Company sought a subsidy of $5 million from the federal government to complete the work. When a direct appropriation met congressional opposition, supporters proposed that the $5 million be in the form of special half dollars which could be sold as souvenirs. The United States had never struck a commemorative, (Note: The 1848 quarter eagle struck at Philadelphia with California gold and marked "CAL." is generally not considered to be a commemorative.) and it was anticipated by organizers that the coins could be sold to the public at double their face value. The bullion would come from the melting of underweight and obsolete silver coins already held by the Treasury, so there would be no expense to the government beyond the costs of production. During the debate over the bill in the Senate, Iowa Senator William B. Allison foresaw, "they would not only be souvenirs for this day and generation but would be transmitted ... to the 200 millions that were to dwell here in the future. Children would cry for them and the old men would demand them." But Ohio Senator John Sherman warned, "the enormous number of [such] half dollars would destroy their value as souvenirs". With Congress anxious to escape the summer Washington heat, the matter was compromised and the amount cut to $2.5 million, thus five million half dollars. Congress passed authorizing legislation on August 5, 1892.

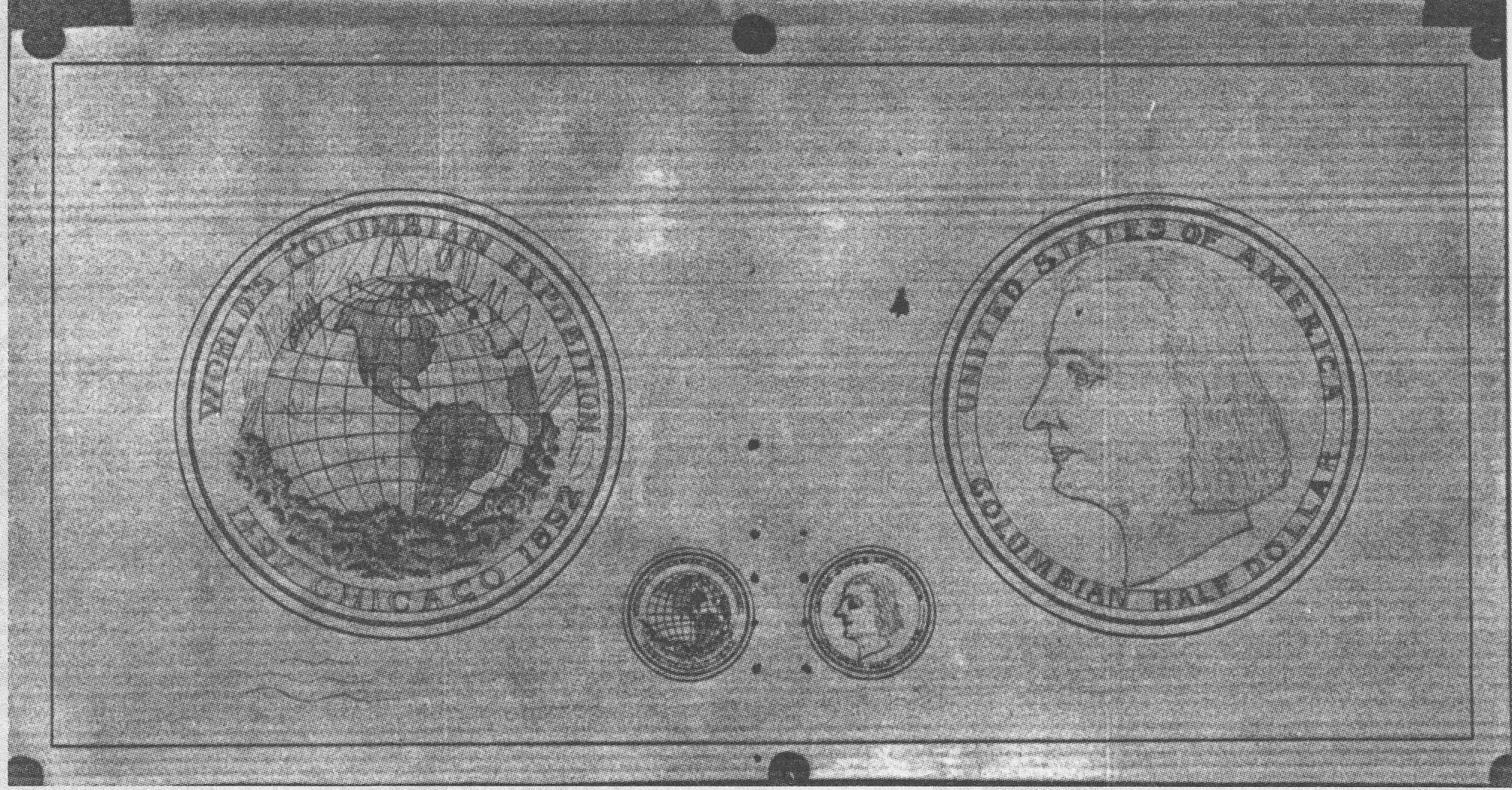
Barber's original sketches for the half dollar, August 1892

In July 1892, Curtis sent a photograph of the Lotto painting to Leech, who consulted with Barber and replied that the engraver could not work from a painting in which the subject faces forward. So that Barber could depict Columbus in profile, Curtis arranged for a little-known Washington, D.C. sculptor, Ulric Stonewall Jackson Dunbar, to create a bust based on the painting at the company's expense; when complete it was forwarded to Barber in Philadelphia. Barber prepared sketches based on the bust on August 15, and presented them to Acting Mint Director Robert E. Preston (Leech was on vacation), who forwarded them to fair authorities in Chicago. Ellsworth showed them to artists working on the exposition, and to the press. The artistic reaction was negative, and the newspapers suggested that the sketches resembled more a long-haired professor than the celebrated mariner. This controversy, coupled with his anger from public debate over whether the painting actually was of Columbus, caused Ellsworth to refuse permission for his painting to be used.

== Preparation ==
Even before the appearance of Barber's sketches, other designs were being considered for the half dollar. In early August, artist Frank Millet proposed to the fair's Director of Decorations, Olin Warner, that Warner design the coin. Warner modeled one depicting a profile of Columbus, not based on the Lotto portrait. His reverse showed a caravel ship, symbolizing the Santa María, Columbus's flagship, above two globes representing the hemispheres, though they lacked the continental outlines. Warner's proposal was praised by artists working on their sculptures at the fairgrounds. Leech also weighed in once he returned from vacation on August 26, sending fair organizers a wood-engraving based on the official Spanish medal for the 400th anniversary of Columbus' first voyage, and arranging with the State Department for the American Embassy in Madrid to get one. A medal was duly obtained and was subsequently placed in the Mint's collection.

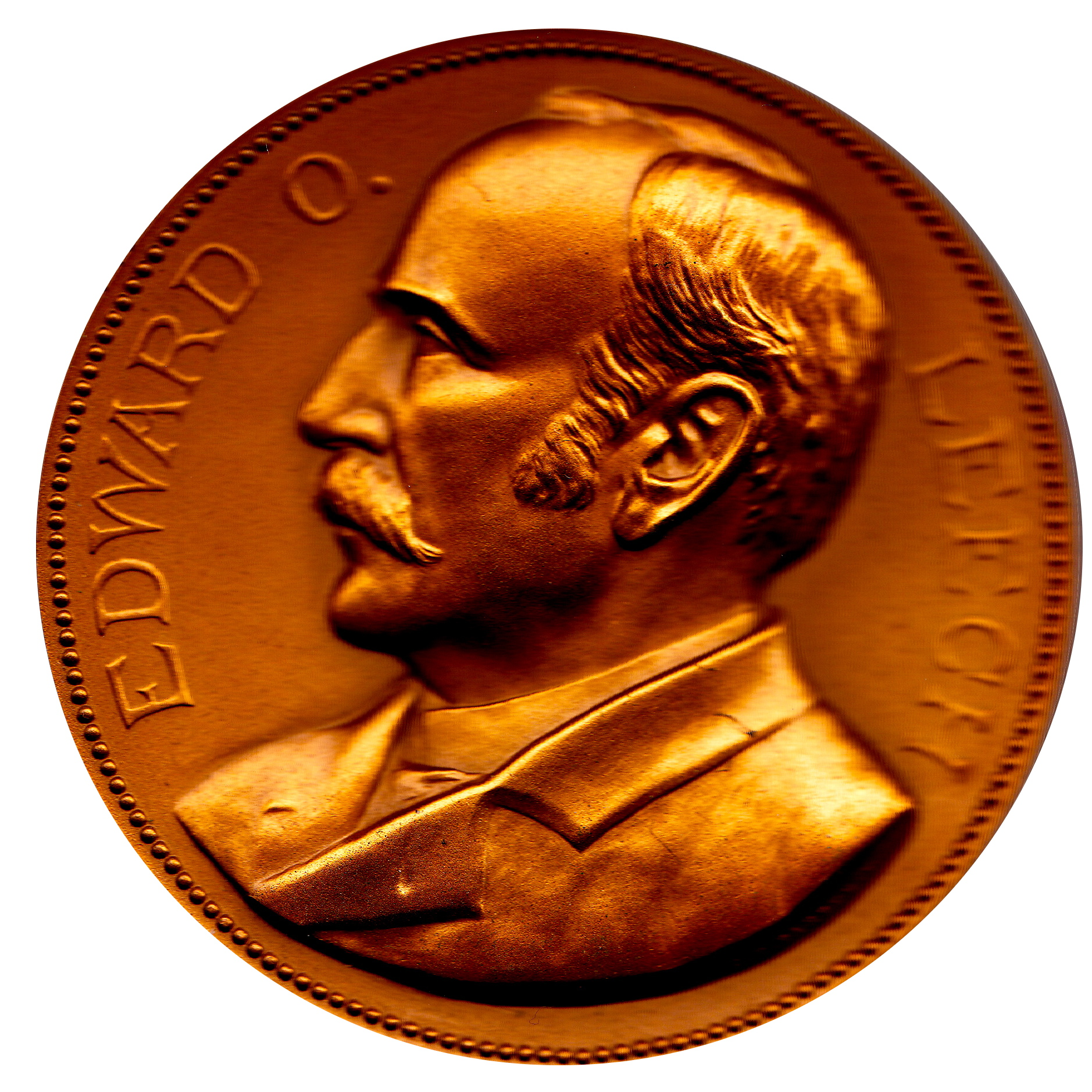
Mint Director Edward O. Leech, on his Mint medal, by Charles E. Barber

The Mint was willing to defer to the company on the design (Ellsworth withdrew his threat not to allow his painting to be used by the end of August), but the company's Finance Committee was unable to reach a decision on what design to use. Warner returned to work on the badges to be worn by the fair's directors at the dedication ceremony in October—the fair itself would not open to the public until May 1893. These badges included a round disk with a portrait of Columbus in high relief based on the Lotto portrait, and when one was displayed it was immediately spoken of as a possible basis for the half dollar. The company also considered a design with three ships, and another with a single ship and a depiction of the Western Hemisphere, both provided by the Mint. Contemporary accounts also mention a reverse design considered by the Company which depicted a building at the Exposition.

Tiring of the back and forth, fair leaders demanded a meeting with Mint officials to settle the matter of the design. The company was in severe financial straits, and money from the sale of the coins was needed. Leech agreed to send Barber to Chicago, where he met with the Finance Committee on September 23, 1892. It was agreed that the obverse would be based on the badges, and the reverse on Warner's caravel concept.

The badge lacked the inscriptions required for coins; to accommodate them, Barber shrank the design, surrounding it with letters. The ship on the reverse did not have sufficient detail in Warner's version; Barber requested a photograph of the caravel to be exhibited at the fair from Ellsworth, then turned the reverse over to his assistant, George T. Morgan. The chief engraver had discerned Ellsworth's desire to have the Lotto portrait used, and several times in October wrote warmly to him, apprising him of progress. By October 17, Barber had completed test dies; by the 31st, trial strikes were made and Barber informed Ellsworth that Leech had pronounced them the best-looking coins ever struck by the Mint. The Mint Director had micromanaged the fine-tuning of the designs for the Barber coinage the previous year; this time he did not intervene, and departed on November 9 for a monetary conference in Brussels.

On November 11, Barber sent Ellsworth cardboard impressions of the latest versions of the coin; Ellsworth expressed pleasure at their appearance. The chief engraver made final adjustments directly to the master die, rather than modifying a larger model to be placed in a reducing lathe. This diework was the technique which his father and predecessor as chief engraver had used; it was also the way in which Charles Barber preferred to work. Barber added his monogram "B" to the design; it is on the cut-off of the bust above the letter B in "Columbian", while Morgan's "M" is hidden in the rigging of the ship on the reverse.

== Release ==
The Chicago Tribune described the scene as the first Columbian half dollars were struck at the Philadelphia Mint on November 19, 1892:

James W. Ellsworth of the World's Fair Commission represented [the Company] ... Over 2,000 of the souvenirs were struck today, and the work will continue until all of the 5,000,000 donated by Congress are completed ... Unfortunately, the first attempt was a failure—a little flaw caused the coin's rejection ... Again the coin was lifted from the face of the steel die and critically examined by [Philadelphia Mint Chief] Coiner [William S.] Steele, Engraver Barber, and [Philadelphia Mint] Sup[erintenden]t [Oliver] Bosbyshell. Every line was sharply defined, and the strong features of the discoverer of America, which adorn the coin, seemed to look approvingly on the work.

Numismatists Anthony Swiatek and Walter Breen, in their encyclopedia of early commemoratives, suggested that the "flawed" first specimen was not destroyed, but was given to Ellsworth, a noted coin collector who possessed rarities such as the Brasher doubloon and two specimens of the 1804 dollar. They deemed it unlikely that experienced Mint workers would have selected a flawed planchet to use in the first strike, and that Ellsworth obtained the piece with Bosbyshell's agreement.

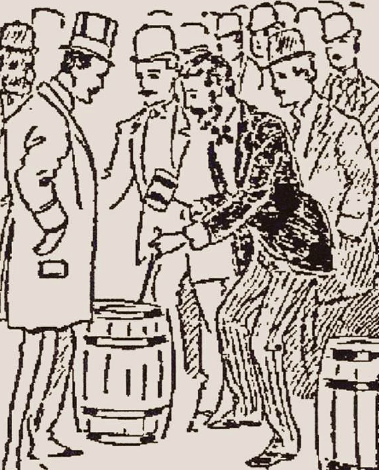
Contemporary woodcut of Exposition Company president Harlow Higinbotham opening the first keg of Columbian half dollars

On December 15, the Mint shipped five kegs of the new coins, each holding 10,000 pieces, to Chicago. Each keg held five bags with a thousand coins each, though in one keg, one bag was intentionally short four coins, as also in that keg was a cigar box containing four envelopes, with coins number 1, 400, 1492, and 1892 from the first day of production. The kegs were taken to the Chicago Sub-Treasury, and on December 19 at 1:00 pm conveyed to Room 404 of the Rand McNally Building, the exposition's headquarters. There, Harlow N. Higinbotham, president of the Exposition Company, took mallet and chisel in hand and opened the keg, removing the cigar box. Placing three of the envelopes in his pocket, he displayed the first coin to the assembled crowd, then exchanged it for a check—Wyckoff, Seamans & Benedict (later the Remington Typewriter Company and makers of the official typewriter of the fair), was purchasing the first coin struck for $10,000 as a publicity stunt. That coin was donated to the newly established Columbian Museum (today the Field Museum). The Company immediately put the pieces on sale for $1 each, and the first shipment was soon all sold to those who lined up to buy them, had ordered them by mail, or had purchased them at local banks that were given allocations. No official packaging was provided; the pieces exist in holders supplied by various banks.

Much of the press coverage at the time focused on the fact that half dollars would be sold for twice face value. The Colorado Sun commented, "The World's Fair people count upon making a good thing by selling their five million souvenir half dollars at premium. The Chicago propensity for speculating in futures cannot be restrained." The Philadelphia Call concurred, "Perhaps the proposition to sell the 50¢ souvenirs at the World's Fair for $1 is an evidence of what visitors to Chicago may expect in the general increase in prices." The design was also a source of comment. The Philadelphia Ledger suggested, "If it were not known in advance whose vignette adorns the Columbian souvenir half dollar, the average observer would be undecided as to whether it is intended to represent Daniel Webster or Henry Ward Beecher." The Boston Globe noted, "The first view of the new Columbian souvenir coin inevitably leads to expression of regret that Columbus wasn't a better looking man." The Galveston Daily News opined of the new half dollars:

The front side of the coin has an elegant likeness of the late Sitting Bull. This, however, is said to be meant for Columbus ... There is also a likeness of Columbus' ship under full sail. At first blush the ship seems to be on wheels, but closer examination shows that the two wheels are the eastern and western hemispheres. The ship seems to be surrounded by a herd of porpoises, but probably this is meant for waves. There is also a fishing pole rigged out of an after port in the cabin of the ship, and one gathers an idea that the venturesome mariner is either baiting his hook and lying about a bite he has just had, or has hauled in a fish, for the line is taken aboard ship. The figures 1492 appear beneath the vessel. The coin is of the same size and weight as the old run of half dollars, and for all they are sold at a heavy premium, the purchasing power is but ten [nickel] beers.

== Sale and aftermath ==
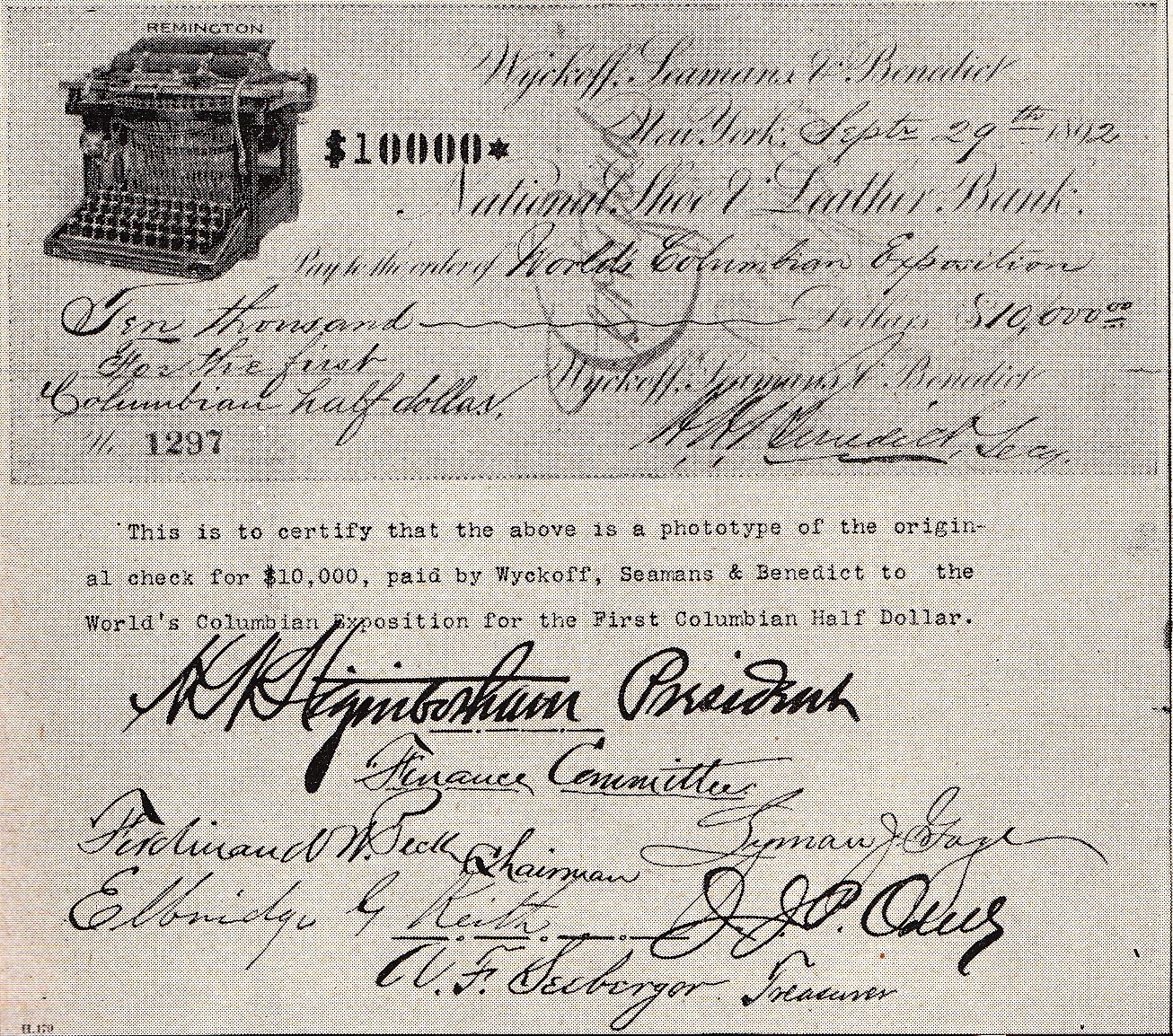
Check used to pay for the first Columbian half dollar

Ellsworth clipped one article criticizing the new coin and sent it to both Barber and Warner. Barber responded angrily with a five-page rebuttal, and suggesting that the Chicago newspapers not print "the opinions of people who display a deplorable amount of ignorance and likewise seem inclined to say 'Stinking Fish' ". Warner reacted with resignation, stating that he had not yet seen the new coin "but I'll wager it doesn't look like the model". A major objection by critics was that Barber had lowered the relief of Warner's badge to ensure that the new coins met the standards of circulating coins and could stack properly; critics saw this as unnecessary as the coins were to be merely souvenirs, unlikely to enter circulation.

A number of proof coins were issued at the suggestion of Barber and Superintendent Bosbyshell. Ellsworth was enthusiastic, intending the special strikes as gifts, but was forced to share them with Company president Higinbotham, to Ellsworth's dismay. The proof coins for the year 1892 represented the first hundred coins struck, as well as numbers 400, 1492, and 1892. The total number of proof coins struck for 1893 is less certain: R.S. Yeoman's A Guide Book of United States Coins states that approximately three to five proofs were struck for 1893; numismatist Ira Goldberg in a 2011 article gives the number as fewer than ten. The first coin struck in the year 1893, in proof, is in the possession of the Chicago Historical Society. The Mint gave consideration to including the Columbian half dollar in proof sets, but at the time it sold proof coins for only a few cents above face value, and it would have to sell the proof Columbians for more than $1 so as to avoid devaluing the uncirculated commemoratives. Mint authorities decided against a public sale of proof Columbians.

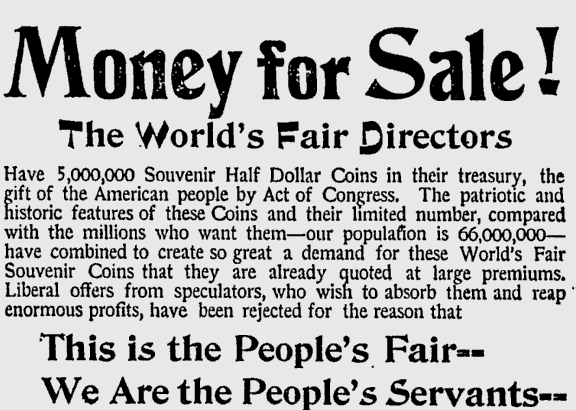
Excerpt from advertisement placed by fair officials in newspapers across the United States

With the New Year, the coins were dated 1893; just over four million of the authorized mintage were struck with an 1893 date, with the remainder dated 1892. A total of 5,002,105 Columbian half dollars were struck, with the excess over the authorized mintage designated for inspection by the annual Assay Commission. By February 1893, sales had fallen off dramatically. The Exposition Company deposited 2,000,000 half dollars in Chicago banks as security for loans. In March, Congress impounded an additional 1,141,700 half dollars to cover costs advanced by the government, such as the expense of judging exhibits and providing medals to the exhibitors. The company could redeem the half dollars if it agreed to fund that expense, which it refused to do, calling the government's action a breach of faith. In return, the Company stated it was no longer bound by a provision of the 1892 act, which forbade the fair from opening on Sundays.

Sales during the fair itself were promoted by such stunts as constructing a model of the Washington, D.C. Treasury Building out of the new half dollars, 20 feet (6.1 m) long and 4 feet (1.2 m) high. These coins were available for purchase, but could not be claimed until after the fair closed. In June 1893, fair authorities had half dollars stacked as a model of the Washington Monument, 22 feet (6.7 m) tall. When the fair closed in October, large quantities of the half dollar remained in the hands of exposition organizers, the Treasury, and the Chicago banks—only 358,645 were sold to the public at the $1 price.

With the fair closed, the question remained what to do with the some 4,600,000 half dollars which had not been sold. Organizers did not wish them to be issued, to preserve the premium price paid by purchasers. Those remaining in the company's hands were redeemed by the Mint, which melted them; the fee for this service was forgiven by act of Congress. The coins which had been impounded by the Treasury were offered for sale at face value beginning in October 1894; when there were few takers, they were released into circulation. A million coins held by the Chicago banks were also placed in circulation. Although 2,501,700 half dollars were melted (all dated 1893), this still left a similar number of Columbians in public hands. Coin dealer and numismatic historian Q. David Bowers recalls that when he began collecting coins as a boy in the 1950s, the Columbians were among the most common 19th-century pieces remaining in circulation. It was not until the 1930s that the pieces, in uncirculated condition, commanded the original price of $1. Prices began to rise as silver coins were replaced by base metal ones in the 1960s. In the 2018 deluxe version of Yeoman's catalog, both pieces are listed at $25 in almost uncirculated (AU-50) condition, with specimens in near-pristine MS-66 listed at $700.

One reason for the lack of sales, and for the poor condition of many surviving specimens, was that while the fair was open, the economic Panic of 1893 began, one of the worst depressions in the nation's history—fifty cents could make the difference between a family eating or starving at a time when the average visitor to the fair spent $1.18. Fairgoers were disinclined to exchange a dollar for a fifty-cent piece, and those who had bought Columbian half dollars before the crash often spent their souvenirs.

== See also ==
- Columbian Issue, a series of postage stamps issued to mark the exposition
- Isabella quarter
