= Lafayette Welcoming Parade of 1824 =

Lafayette Welcoming Parade of 1824 may refer to:

- Lafayette Welcoming Parade of 1824 (New York City)
- Lafayette Welcoming Parade of 1824 (Philadelphia)
