= Cadmus (1818 ship) =

History

United States
- Name: Cadmus
- Owner: 1818:Whitlock Line; 1827: Mulford and Sleight; 1849: Captain George G. White
- Builder: S.Wright, New York
- Launched: 1818
- Fate: Abandoned 1850; buried thereafter

General characteristics
- Tons burthen: 306, 307, or 310 (bm)
- Length: 97 ft 6 in (29.7 m)
- Beam: 26 ft 9 in (8.2 m)
- Depth of hold: 13 ft 4 in (4.1 m)

Cadmus was built in 1818 in New York. She was a packet sailing between New York and Havre. In 1824, Cadmus carried General Lafayette to New York on a visit at the invitation of the U.S. Congress. From 1827, Cadmus became a whaler, sailing from Sag Harbor, New York. She made 17 complete whaling voyages. During her whaling years Cadmus brought in oil and whale bone worth a total of $359,000. In 1849, a new owner sailed her to California so that he and his crew could take part in the gold rush there. They abandoned her in San Francisco, where she became a storehouse until she became too leaky; her bones were eventually buried under fill.

== Career ==
Cadmus was the sole packet of the Whitlock Line, owned by William Whitlock, Jr., of New York, which sailed to Havre. (Note: The Havre Old Line and the Whitlock Line later combined to form the Union Line, which operated until 1863–1864.) Cadmus was the Whitlock Line's first vessel and she served from 1823 to 1828.

In 1824, Cadmus, Francis Allyn, master, carried General Lafayette to New York on the first leg of his 1824-1825 visit to the United States. President James Monroe and Congress invited Lafayette to visit the United States in 1824, in part to celebrate the nation's upcoming 50th anniversary. Monroe intended to have Lafayette travel on an American warship, but Lafayette felt that having such a vessel as transport was undemocratic and booked passage on Cadmus.

Whitlock made Cadmus available to Lafayette. To do so Whitlock had to cancel some passengers and cargo that he had already booked. As a result, he gave up all passenger and freight earnings for the voyage.

Lafayette arrived at New York on 15 August 1824, accompanied by his son Georges Washington and his secretary Auguste Levasseur. (Note: A number of manufacturers made blue plates commemorating the event and bearing a picture of Cadmus.) (Note: Francis Allyn sailed as master on several vessels into the 1830s. He retired to New London, Connecticut, where he served as mayor (1838–1841). His will was probated in 1862.)

On 18 September 1826, Cadmus, Allen, master, took out five crew members from Neptune, at 39°N 66°W. Neptune, of Nova Scotia, had become water-logged and dismasted on her way from St Kitts to Nova Scotia after having encountered a gale on 8 September at 28°N 69°W. One man of Neptune's crew died in the incident. Seven hours after Cadmus rescued Neptune's crew, she put Simon Newcomb (Neptune's master), and three men on Eliza, which was coming from Sumatra, and which took them to Salem. One man joined Cadmus.

From 1827, Cadmus became a whaler, sailing from Sag Harbor, New York. (Note: Albion notes that Cadmus became a whaler, but he confuses her with Cadmus.) She made 17 complete whaling voyages. As of February 2023, almost nothing is known of her first whaling voyage.

2nd whaling voyage (1828–1829): In 1828 Captain George Howell sailed from Sag Harbor. He returned in 1829 with 28 barrels of sperm oil, 1927 barrels of whale oil, and 17,012 pounds of whale bone.

3rd whaling voyage (1829–1830): Captain Howell sailed in 1829 and returned in 1830. Cadmus returned with 107 barrels of sperm oil, 1,468 barrels of whale oil, and 12,622 pounds of whale bone.

4th whaling voyage (1831–1832): Captain Howell sailed in 1831 and returned in 1832 with 2,150 barrels of whale oil.

5th whaling voyage (1832–1833): Captain Howell sailed in 1832 and returned in 1832 with 1,150 barrels of whale oil.

6th whaling voyage (1833–1834): Captain David Hand, Jr. sailed in 1833 and returned in 1834 with 1,850 barrels of whale oil.

7th whaling voyage (1834–1835): Captain Hand sailed in 1834 and returned in 1835 with 1,200 barrels of whale oil.

8th whaling voyage (1835–1836): Captain Hand sailed in 1835 and returned in 1836 with 380 barrels of sperm oil and 820 barrels of whale oil.

9th whaling voyage (1836–1837): Captain Hand sailed in 1836 and returned in 1837 with 90 barrels of sperm oil and 1,800 barrels of whale oil.

10th whaling voyage (1837–1838): Captain Hand, or Benton Hedges sailed in 1837 and returned in 1838 with 90 barrels of sperm oil and 1,800 barrels of whale oil.

11th whaling voyage (1838–1839): Captain Henry Babcock sailed in 1838 and returned in 1839 with 500 barrels of whale oil.

12th whaling voyage (1839–1841): Captain Henry Nickerson, Jr. sailed in 1839 and returned in 1841 with 553 barrels of sperm oil, 1,473 barrels of whale oil, and 12,000 pounds of whalebone.

14th whaling voyage (1841–1843): Captain David Smith sailed in 1841 and returned in 1843 with 70 barrels of sperm oil and 2,000 barrels of whale oil.

15th whaling voyage (1843–1845): Captain Smith sailed in 1843 and returned in 1845 with 300 barrels of sperm oil, and 1,100 barrels of whale oil, and 8,000 pounds of whalebone. During this voyage he visited the Crozet Islands. Another source reports that Cadmus had returned on 9 June 1845 from the North Pacific with 295 barrels of sperm oil, 896 barrels of whale oil, and 7,200 pounds of whale bone.

16th whaling voyage (1845–1847): Captain Smith sailed in 1845 and returned in 1847 with 150 barrels of sperm oil, and 1,850 barrels of whale oil, and 8,000 pounds of whalebone.

17th whaling voyage (1847–1849): Captain Smith sailed in 1847 and returned in 1849 with 80 barrels of sperm oil, 1,720 barrels of whale oil, and 13,000 pounds of whalebone.

When Cornelia, Flanders, master, returned to New Bedford on 31 July 1848, she was carrying 4,600 pounds of whalebone, of which 4,000 belonged to Cadmus. Homeward-bound whalers would often carry product for whalers that wished to remain out a little longer. In return, the owners of the vessel would receive freight for the extra cargo.

== Fate ==
In 1848 gold was discovered in California. Captain George G. White purchased Cadmus in 1849 and sailed her to California via Cape Horn to participate in the gold rush. She was one of 16 vessels to sail from Sag Harbour for San Francisco. On Christmas Day 1849 she was at Rio de Janeiro, together with 14 other United States vessels on their way to San Francisco. The crews celebrated with music and small arms fire, somewhat to the displeasure of the local authorities. The author of the account stated that only Cadmus was the only vessel worthy of special mention as she had carried General Lafayette to the United States on his visit. When she arrived in San Francisco her captain and crew abandoned her and her bones reportedly now lie under the city.

Cadmus may have been used for some time as a storehouse until she became too leaky for that purpose. Some people made walking sticks from her locust stanchions. Her deck-house became a balcony for a cottage in the suburbs. Lastly, her bottom planks and knees went to refurbishing a portion of Battery Street.

Another account reports that in July 1850, some 526 vessels were drifting in the cove at Yerba Buena. Their masters, officers, and crews had abandoned them to go gold hunting. Cadmud, which had carried General Lafayette, was one of them. She was among the vessels that were in the Montgomery Street fill and that were in the mud in February 1857.
