= Lafayette Welcoming Parade of 1824 (New York City) =

Parade welcoming the Marquis de Lafayette to New York City

Lafayette Welcoming Parade
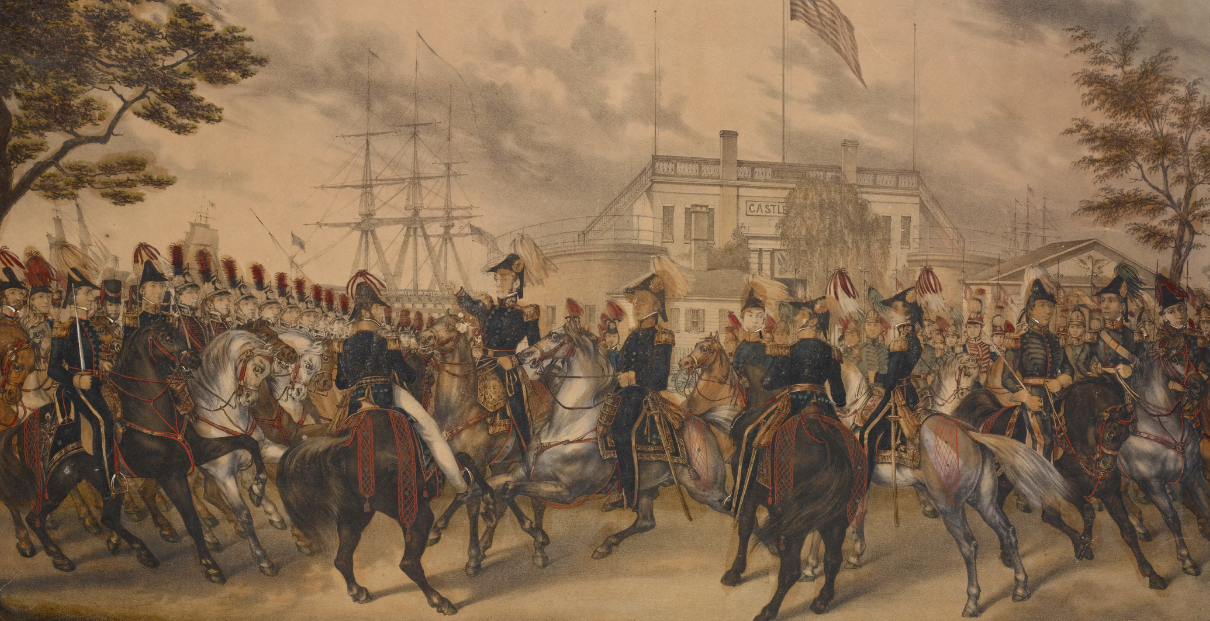
- The military escort forms at Castle Clinton to await the arrival of Lafayette.
- Date: August 16, 1824
- Location: New York, New York, United States
- Type: parade
- Organized by: City of New York
- Participants: Marquis de Lafayette

The Lafayette Welcoming Parade of 1824 was a parade held in New York City on August 16, 1824, to welcome the arrival of the Marquis de Lafayette on the occasion of his visit to the United States for a sixteen-month tour. It has been described as the first triumphal parade in New York history.

== Background ==
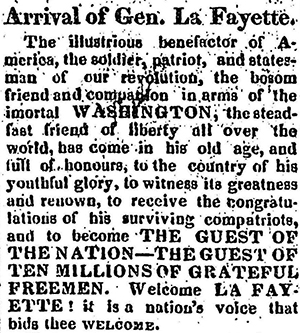
An account in the Woodstock Observer of Lafayette's arrival in New York.

In 1824 the Marquis de Lafayette was the last living general of the American War of Independence. That year, the United States Congress issued a formal invitation for him to visit the United States; penned by President James Monroe, it informed the marquis that "the whole nation ardently desire to see you again among them". News that Lafayette had accepted Congress' invitation prompted a flurry of articles in the leading newspapers of the nation issuing increasingly hysterical appeals for the organization of lavish celebrations, including one popular suggestion that every town from "Maine to Louisiana" fire simultaneous artillery salutes once word had arrived Lafayette had set foot on American territory. Lafayette was called "the greatest man in the world" in some press reports.

== Events ==
The Marquis de Lafayette, accompanied by his son Georges Washington de La Fayette and a personal staff, arrived in the United States at Staten Island on Sunday, August 15, 1824. His arrival was greeted with a thirteen-gun salute from the batteries of Fort Diamond, accompanied by numerous additional cannon volleys from U.S. Navy and merchant ships in harbor. As the marquis' entourage prepared to make the short trip to Manhattan, it was intercepted by one of the sons of Vice-President of the United States Daniel D. Tompkins who arrived in a steamboat as an emissary of the city government. The young Tompkins requested Lafayette delay his entrance into Manhattan as the city was observing the Sabbath and would not be able to welcome him appropriately. The trip to Manhattan was, therefore, postponed to Monday, August 16. That evening a reception was held for Lafayette by fellow companions of the Cincinnati.

Lafayette and his entourage landed at Castle Clinton where an enormous military escort had been assembled to usher him along Broadway and to the New York City Hall, where he was to be greeted by Mayor Stephen Allen, a route lined by upwards of 50,000 people (about one-third of the city's population at the time). The marquis' secretary, Auguste Levasseur, described the landing ceremony and parade in a journal he kept of the tour:

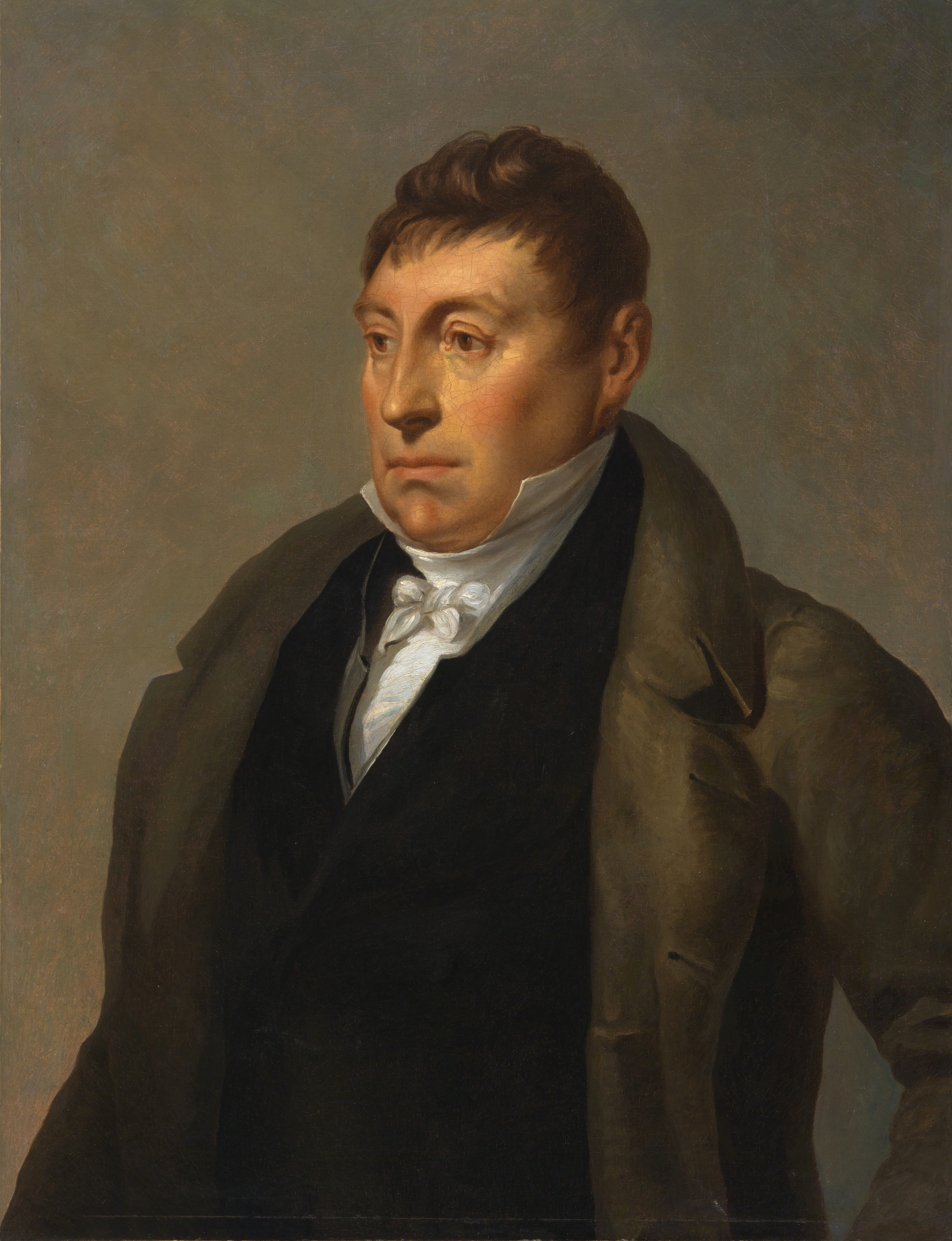
The 67-year-old Lafayette was so widely celebrated on his arrival in New York that, the New York Mirror wrote, "ladies forget their lovers to dream of him".

The general, attended by a numerous and brilliant staff, marched along the front; as he advanced, each corps presented arms and saluted him with its colours; all were decorated with a riband bearing his portrait. During this review, the cannon thundered from the shore, in the forts, and from all the vessels of war. At the extremity of the line of troops, elegant carriages were in waiting. General Lafayette was seated in a car drawn by four white horses, and in the midst of an immense crowd, we went to the City Hall. On our way, all the streets were decorated with flags and drapery, and from all the windows flowers and wreathes were showered upon the general.

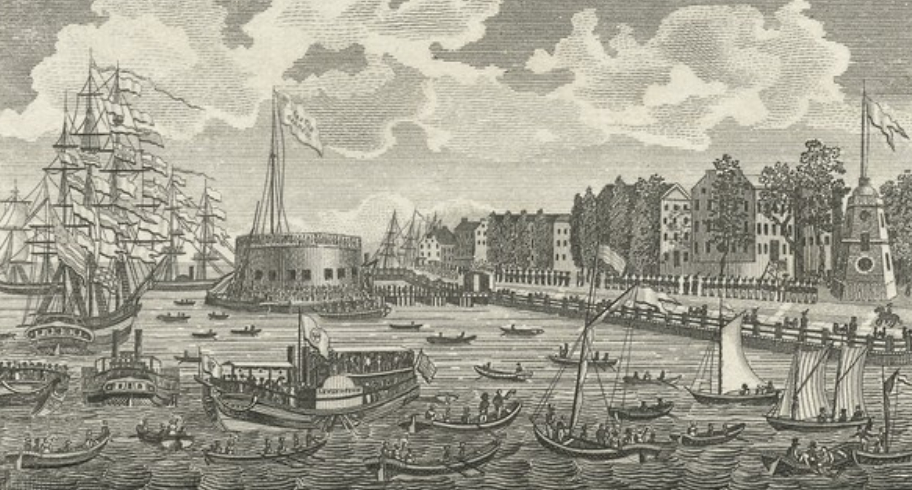
Lafayette's barge travels from Staten Island to Castle Clinton.

The driver of Lafayette's coach became a minor, temporary celebrity among the onlookers as he waited for the marquis; when one of his horses became perturbed by the growing throng, contemporary accounts report the man calmed him with the words "behave pretty now, Charley – you are going to carry the greatest man in the world". The New York Mirror, meanwhile, wrote of New Yorkers response to the entrance of Lafayette into the city:

Gentlemen are ready to throw by their business to shake him by the hand, and ladies forget their lovers to dream of him. If a man asks 'have you seen him?' you know who he means.

The military escort was formed of New York militia, including the Lafayette Guards (1st Company, New York State Artillery), the Washington Greys (8th Regiment, New York Volunteers), the "Morris Cadets" and the Brooklyn Horse Guards.

== Next parade and legacy ==
After more than a year spent touring the United States, Lafayette returned to New York in July 1825, two months before his departure for France. The welcoming festivity on this occasion has been called one "of the most unusual celebrations of Lafayette" that had taken place to that date. In and around Castle Clinton a crowd estimated to be between 15,000 and 40,000 people gathered, chanting Lafayette's name. A fireworks show was followed by the ascent of the hot air balloon The American Star, piloted by aeronaut Eugene Robinson. Lafayette was invited to cut the anchor cables to the balloon. As Robinson sailed over the crowd he delivered a gallant salute in Lafayette's direction and then produced American and French flags which he dropped from the balloon, allowing them to float gently to earth.

The parade has been described as "New York's first all-out welcoming parade" and established a precedent by which future Canyon of Heroes parades have been held. In 2007, the New York Historical Society organized an exhibit commemorating the visit of Lafayette to New York. The exhibit was visited by Arnaud Meunier Du Houssoy, the great-great-great grandson of Lafayette. The 200th anniversary of Lafayette's arrival in New York City was celebrated from August 15 to 18, 2024.

== See also ==
- Lafayette Welcoming Parade of 1824 (Philadelphia)
- Ticker tape parade
