= Ticker-tape parade =

Urban celebration during which shredded paper is thrown over a parade

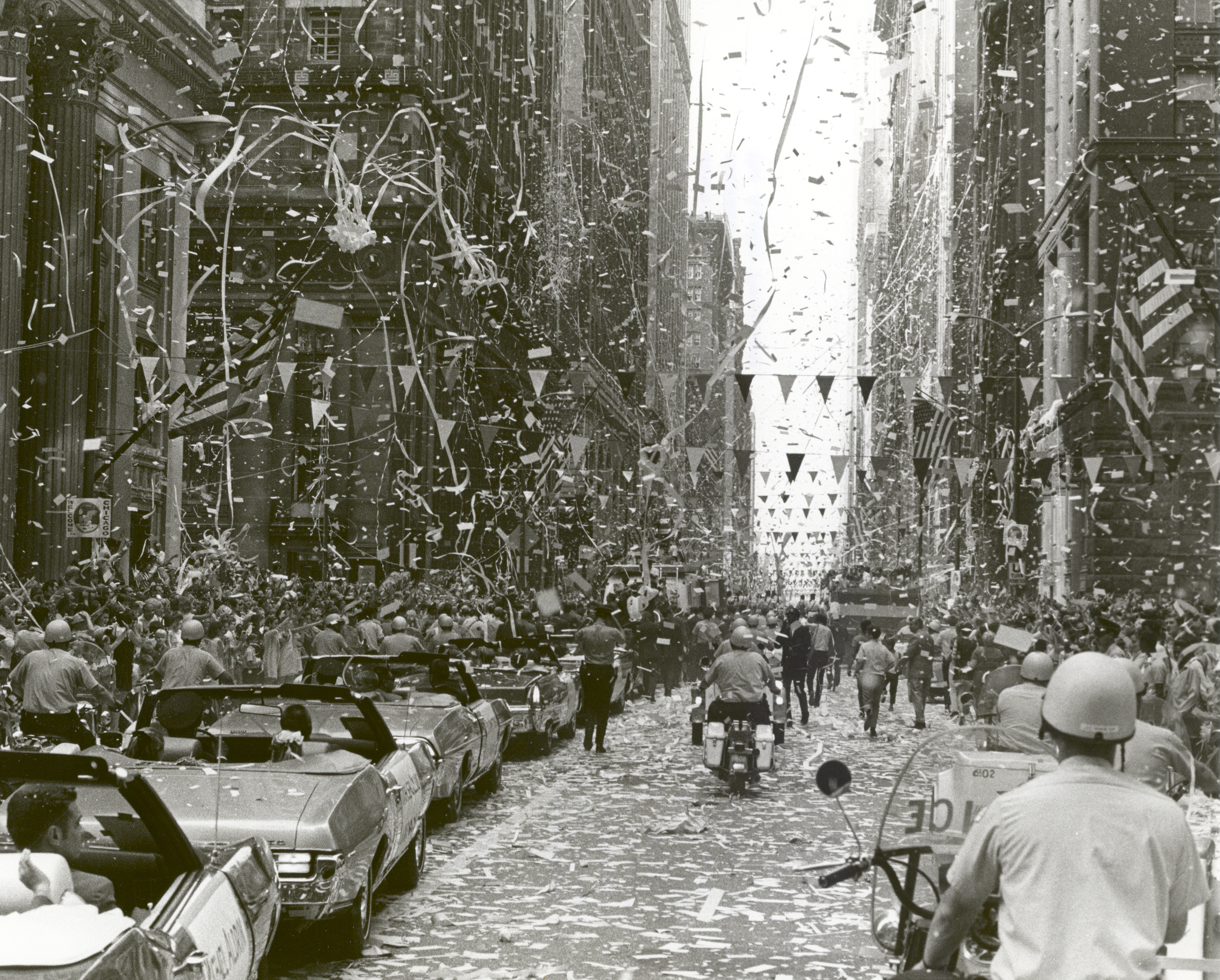
Ticker-tape parade in Chicago in 1969 for the Apollo 11 astronauts

A ticker-tape parade is a parade event held in an urban setting, characterized by large amounts of shredded paper thrown onto the parade route from the surrounding buildings, creating a celebratory flurry of paper. Originally stock ticker paper tape was used, but confetti is now used.

The concept originates in and is most usually associated with the United States, especially New York City. After Argentina won the 1978 FIFA World Cup it was reported that a ticker tape celebration was held.

== History ==
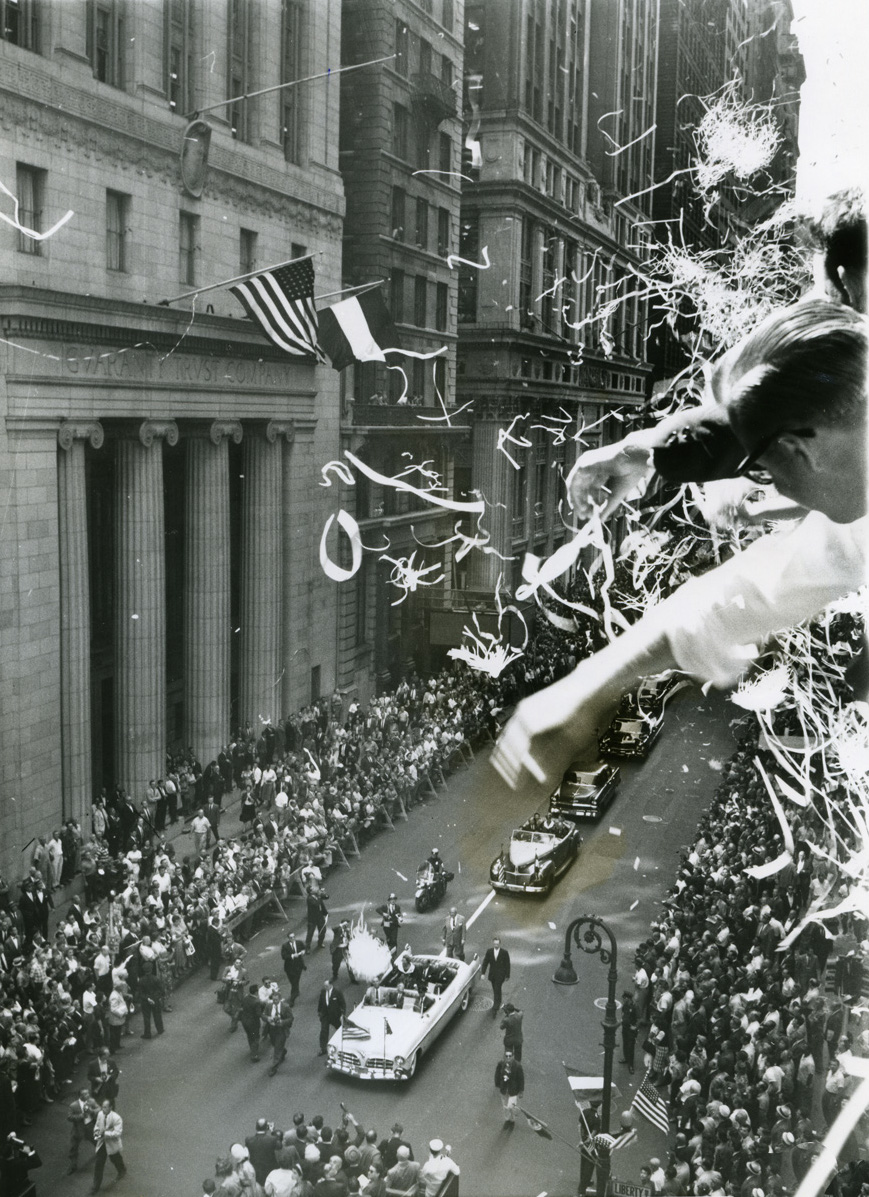
A New York City ticker-tape parade for Beatrix of the Netherlands in 1959. Actual lengths of paper tape are used.

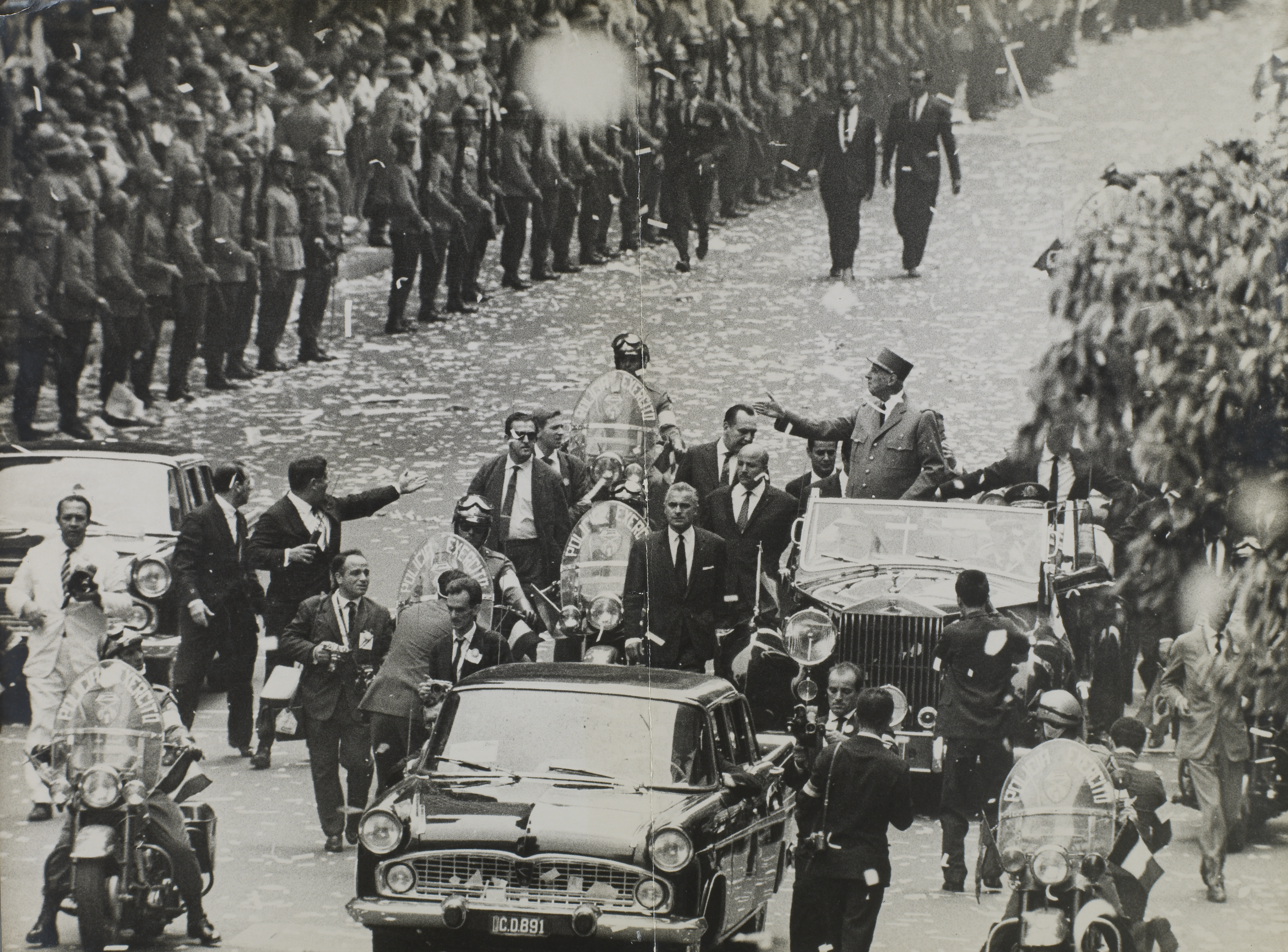
Ticker-tape parade for French president Charles de Gaulle in Rio de Janeiro, Brazil, 1964

The origins go as far as August 1824 in relation to Marquis de Lafayette's return to the US after forty years away. The parades were held in New York City in honor of the last surviving major general of the Continental Army: "All the streets [were] decorated with flags and drapery and from all the windows flowers wreaths showered upon the general." Lafayette's welcome parade up Broadway established a model repeated many times, until it became a fixture of public life in New York City, eventually evolving into the ticker-tape parade.

The term "ticker-tape parade" stuck after a spontaneous celebration held in New York City on October 28, 1886, during the dedication of the Statue of Liberty and is still most closely associated with New York City. The term ticker tape originally referred to the use of the paper output of ticker-tape machines, which were remotely driven devices used in brokerages to provide updated financial quotes of company shares. The term ticker came from the sound made by the machine as it printed.

In New York City, ticker-tape parades are reserved for special occasions. Soon after the first such parade in 1886, city officials realized the utility of such events and began to hold them on triumphal occasions, such as the return of Theodore Roosevelt from his African safari, Gertrude Ederle swimming the English Channel, and Charles Lindbergh's trans-Atlantic flight. The first individual to be honored with a ticker-tape parade was Admiral George Dewey, hero of the battle of Manila Bay, in 1899, when two million people came out to New York City. Gertrude Ederle, Queen of the Waves, Olympian, and first woman to swim the English Channel had a ticker-tape parade in Manhattan with estimated 2 million people in 1926. Following, World War II, several ticker-tape parades were given in honor of victorious generals and admirals, including General Dwight D. Eisenhower and Admiral Chester Nimitz. Two of the longest and largest ticker-tape parades were given for World War II and Korean War General Douglas MacArthur in 1951, after he was relieved of duty by President Harry S. Truman, and for astronaut John Glenn in 1962. Golfers Bobby Jones (1921 and 1930) and Ben Hogan (1953) were honored with ticker-tape parades after their British Open triumphs.

The section of lower Broadway through the Financial District that serves as the parade route for these events is colloquially called the "Canyon of Heroes". More than 200 black granite strips embedded in the sidewalks along the Canyon of Heroes list those honored by past ticker-tape parades. By the early 21st century, such parades became far more infrequent, largely limited to championship sports teams, and celebrations of the return of astronauts and military troops.

Ticker tape as such became obsolete in the 1960s, as television and computers came into use for transmitting financial information. Modern parades utilize waste office paper and toilet paper that have been cut using conventional paper shredders. The city also distributes paper confetti.

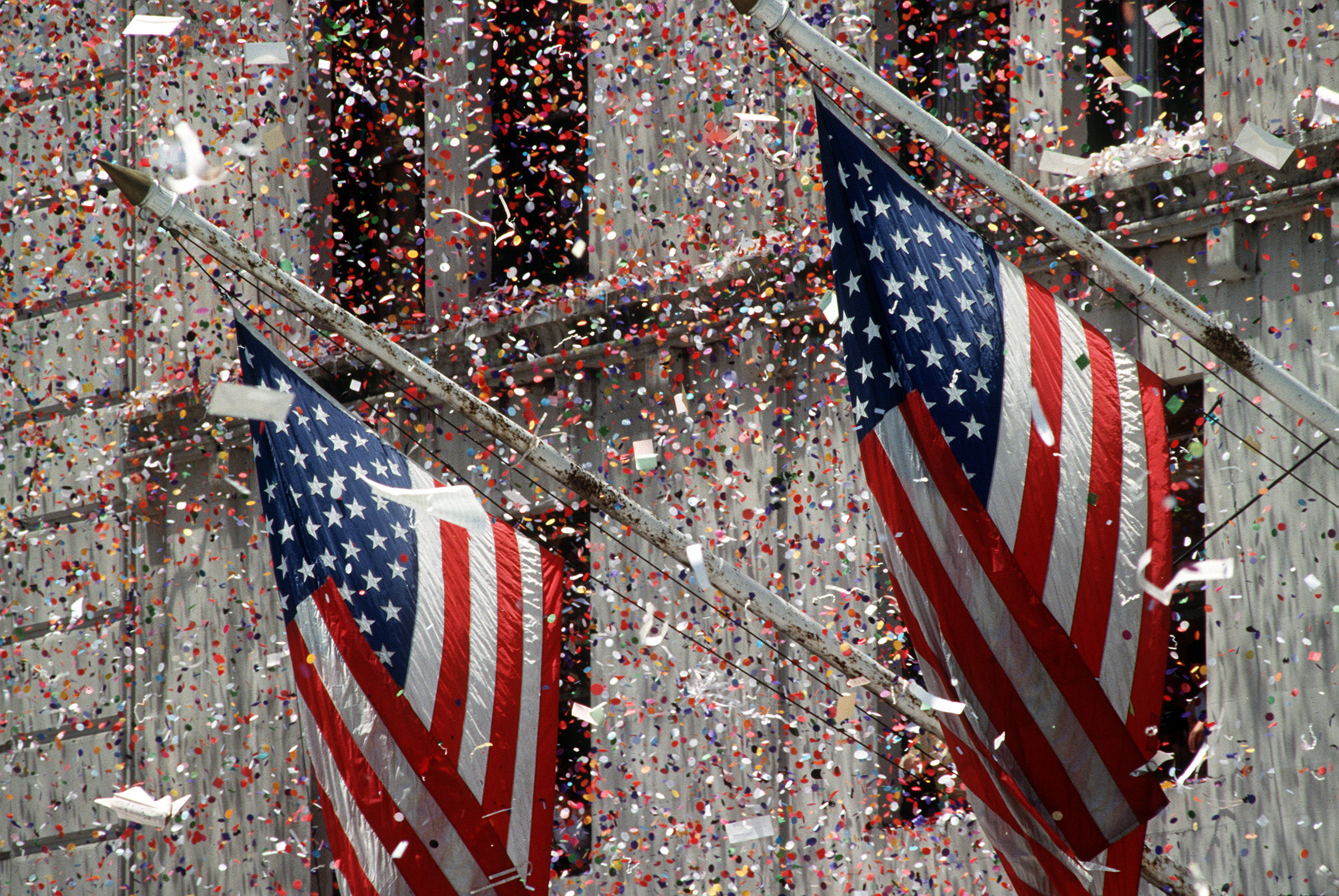
Confetti falls on the street during the Desert Storm Welcome Home parade in New York City in 1991.

== See also ==
- Lafayette Welcoming Parade of 1824 (New York)
- List of ticker-tape parades in New York City
