= Georges Washington de La Fayette =

French army officer, son of the Marquis de La Fayette (1779-1849)

Georges Washington
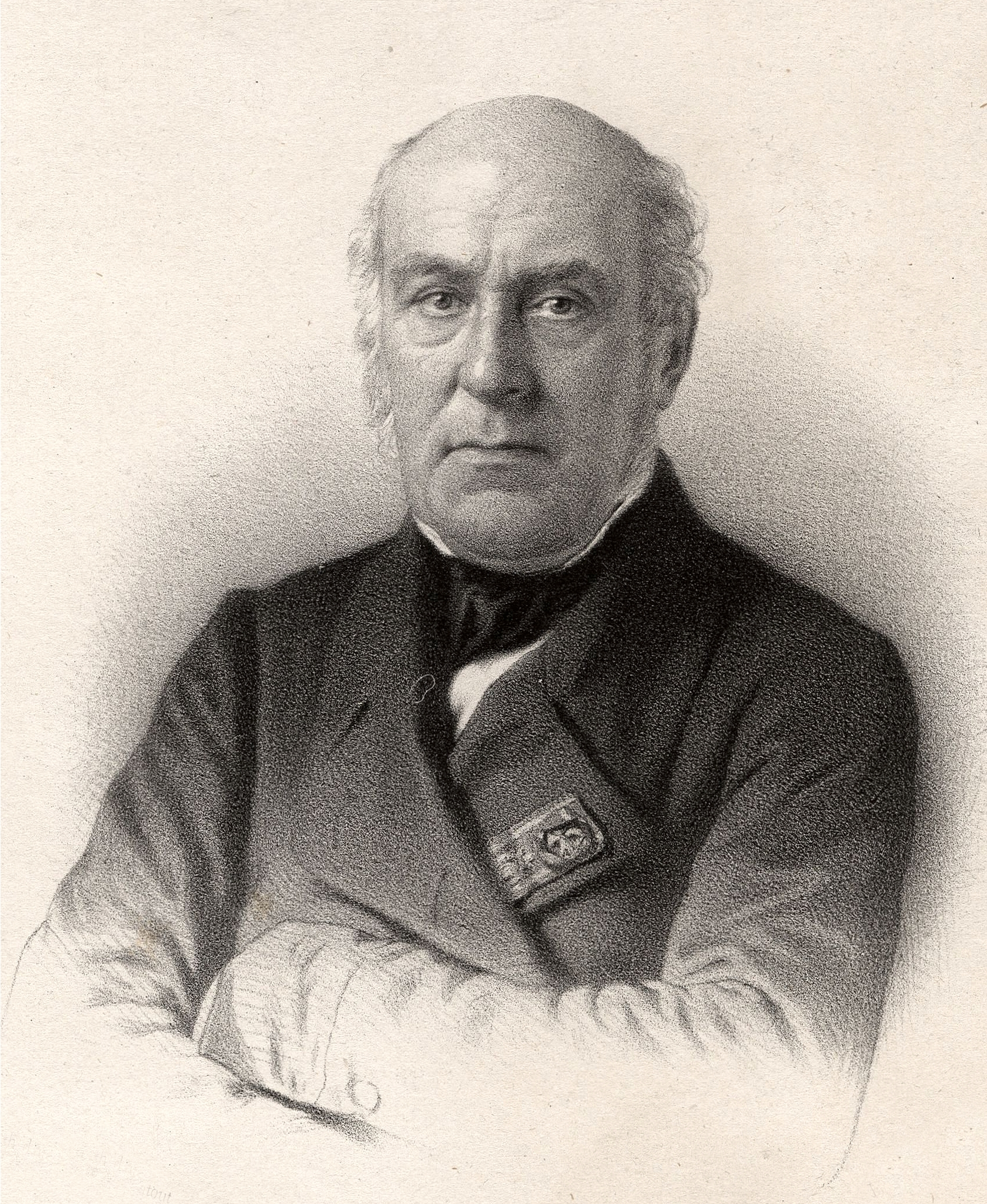
- Lithograph by Émile Desmaisons, 1848

Vice President of the Constituent Assembly
- In office 4 May 1848 – 26 May 1849
- Preceded by: Office established
- Succeeded by: Office abolished

Member of the Chamber of Deputies for Haute-Loire
- In office 17 November 1827 – 26 May 1849
- In office 16 May 1822 – 24 December 1823
- In office 12 May 1815 – 13 July 1815

Personal details
- Born: Georges Washington Louis Gilbert de Lafayette; 24 December 1779 Paris, Kingdom of France
- Died: 29 November 1849 (aged 69) Paris, French Second Republic
- Party: Aide-toi
- Spouse: Émilie Destutt de Tracy (m. 1802)
- Children: 5
- Parent(s): Gilbert du Motier, Marquis de Lafayette; Adrienne de La Fayette
- Education: Harvard University

Military service
- Allegiance: French First Republic; French First Empire
- Years of service: 1800–1807
- Battles/wars: French Revolutionary Wars; Battle of Pozzolo; Napoleonic Wars; Battle of Eylau

Georges Washington Louis Gilbert de La Fayette (24 December 1779 – 29 November 1849) was the son of Gilbert du Motier, Marquis de Lafayette, the French officer and hero of the American Revolution, and Adrienne de La Fayette. He was named in honor of George Washington, under whom his father served in the Revolutionary War.

== Early life ==
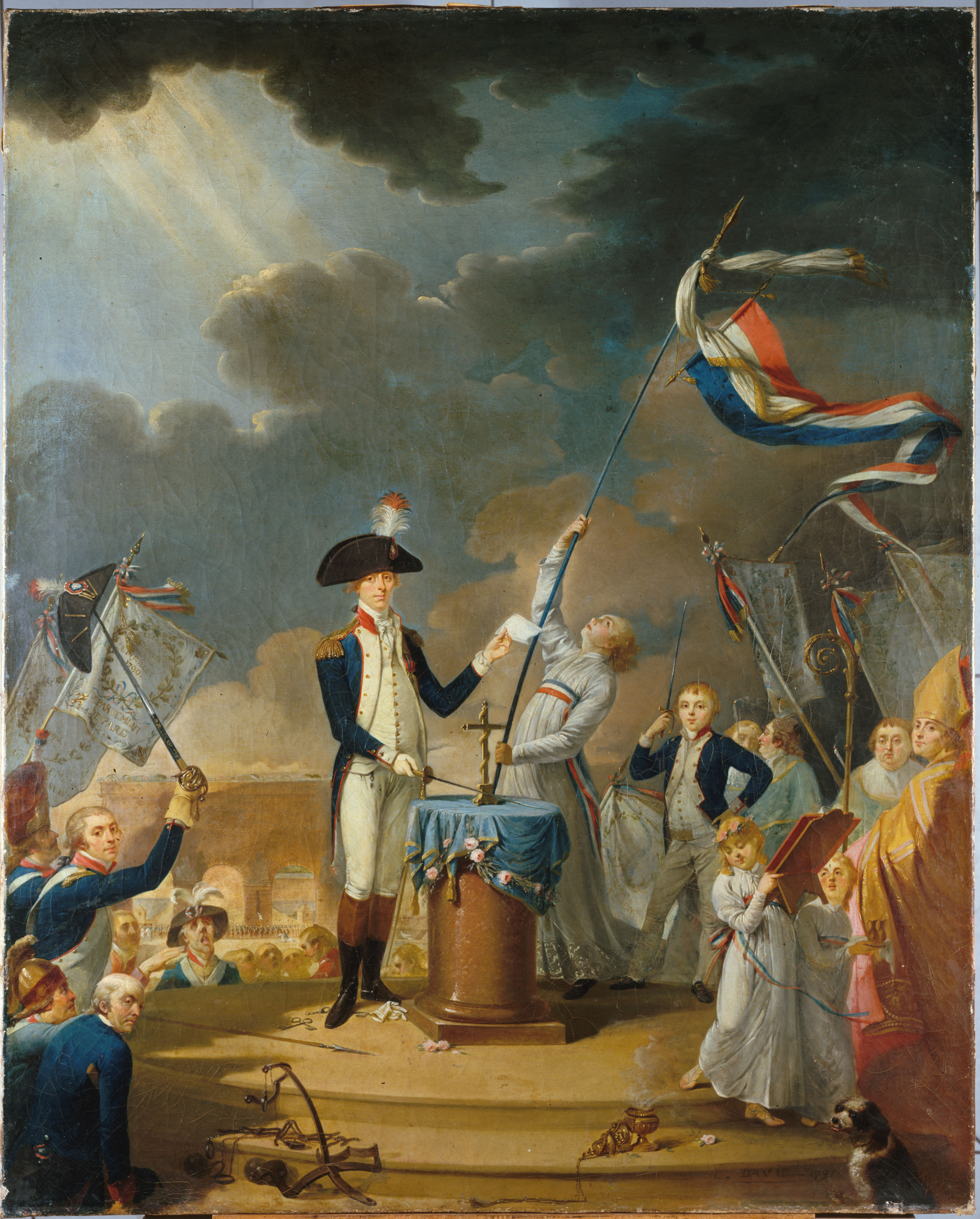
The oath of La Fayette at the Fête de la Fédération, 14 July 1790. Talleyrand, then Bishop of Autun can be seen on the right. The standing child is the son of La Fayette, the young Georges Washington de La Fayette. French School, 18th century, Musée Carnavalet.

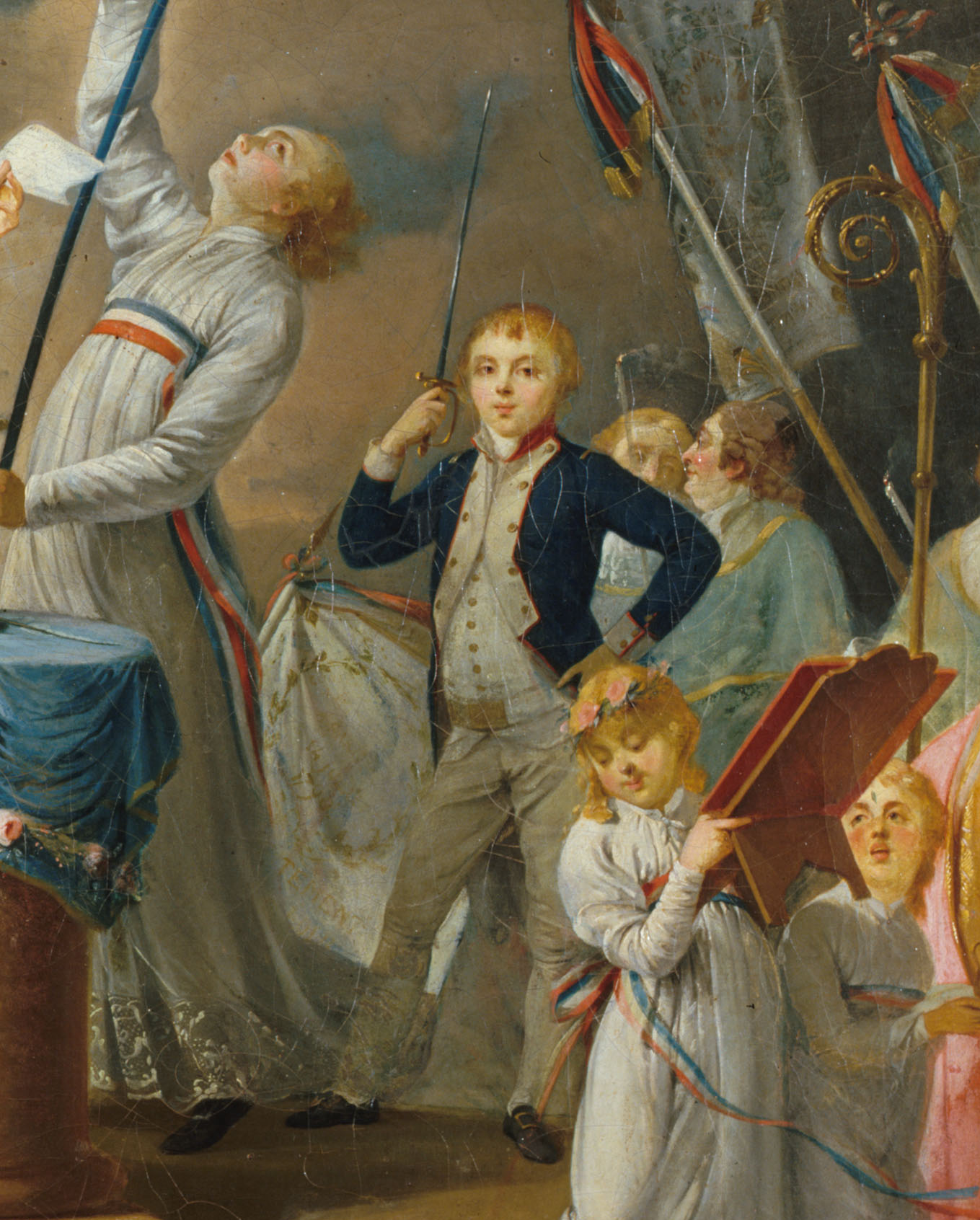
Zoom-in of The oath of La Fayette at the Fête de la Fédération showing young Georges Washington de La Fayette

La Fayette was born in Paris on Christmas Eve in 1779, while his father was on a one-year return to France. He was christened the next day and named after George Washington, the victorious commanding general of America's Continental Army in the American Revolutionary War. The elder Lafayette said the gesture was "a tribute of respect and love for my dear friend."

From 1783, La Fayette grew up in the Hôtel de La Fayette at 183 rue de Bourbon, Paris. Their home was the headquarters of Americans in Paris. Benjamin Franklin, John and Sarah Livingston Jay, and John and Abigail Adams met there every Monday, where they dined with the La Fayette family and with the liberal nobility, including Stanislas Marie Adélaïde, comte de Clermont-Tonnerre, Madame de Staël, André Morellet, and Jean-François Marmontel.

In 1789, the French Revolution began. After 10 September 1792, in the wake of the September Massacres, La Fayette went into hiding with his tutor, Félix Frestrel. His mother was put under house arrest and, later, in prison. On 22 July 1794, his great-grandmother, Catherine de Cossé, duchesse de Noailles, his grandmother, Henriette Anne Louise d'Aguesseau, duchesse d'Ayen, and aunt, Anne Jeanne Baptiste Louise, vicomtesse d'Ayen, were guillotined. On 15 October 1795, Georges' mother was sent to join his father and his sisters, Anastasie and Virginie, in the prison fortress of Olmütz. All of their money and baggage were confiscated. On 18 September 1797, the family was released under the terms of the treaty of Campo-Formio (18 October 1797). They recuperated at Lehmkuhlen, Holstein, near his aunt Madame de Montagu and great-aunt Madame de Tessé.

== Adult life ==
In April 1795, Georges was sent to America with Frestrel. While there, he studied at Harvard University, and he was a house guest of George Washington at the presidential mansion in Philadelphia, Pennsylvania, and at the Washington family home, Mount Vernon in Virginia. He lived with the Washingtons for two years, from 1796 to 1798.

In 1798, Georges returned to France from the United States. In 1799, the family moved to Vianen, near Utrecht during the brief time it was the Batavian Republic. Since Georges was turned back at the French border as an exile, he stayed behind with his father, while his mother Adrienne returned to France. After Napoleon's plebiscite, on 1 March 1800, he restored La Fayette's citizenship and removed their names from the émigrés list.

Georges entered the army and was wounded at the Battle of Pozzolo in 1800. Later, he was aide-de-camp to General Grouchy at the Battle of Eylau, 1807, where he gave up his horse, at the risk of his own life. Napoleon's distrust of Georges' father's independence rendered promotion improbable, and Georges de La Fayette retired into private life in 1807. During the Restoration he entered the Chamber of Deputies and voted consistently on the Liberal side. He was away from Paris during the revolution of July 1830, but he took an active part in the Campagne des banquets, which led up to the Revolution of 1848.

Georges accompanied his father on the latter's triumphant visit to America in 1824 and 1825. Throughout most of the long tour, he kept close company with his father's secretary, Auguste Levasseur. They observed a volunteer fire company turnout in New York City. He met George Washington Parke Custis at Arlington House. He visited Mount Vernon and met Thomas Jefferson at Monticello.

== Personal life ==
In 1802, Georges Washington de Lafayette married Émilie Destutt de Tracy, daughter of the Comte de Tracy. Together, they had three daughters and two sons:

- Natalie Renée du Motier de Lafayette (1803–1878), who married Adolphe Périer, a banker and nephew of Casimir Pierre Périer;
- Charlotte Matilde du Motier de Lafayette (1805–1886), who married Maurice de Pusy (1799–1864), the son of Jean-Xavier Bureau de Pusy;
- Clémentine Adrienne du Motier de Lafayette (1809–1886), who married Gustave de Beaumont (1802–1866);
- Oscar Thomas Gilbert Motier de La Fayette (1815–1881) was educated at the École Polytechnique and served as an artillery officer in Algeria. He entered the Chamber of Deputies in 1846 and voted, like his father, with the extreme Left. After the revolution of 1848, he received a post in the provisional government; as a member of the Constituent Assembly, he became secretary of the war committee. After the dissolution of the Legislative Assembly in 1851, he retired from public life, but emerged on the establishment of the third republic, becoming a life senator in 1875;
- Edmond François du Motier de La Fayette (1818–1890) shared his brother's political opinions; Edmond was one of the secretaries of the Constituent Assembly and a member of the senate from 1876 to 1888.

Lafayette and Tracy lived at their family estate LaGrange, outside Paris, where he spent the rest of his life until his death in 1849, at the age of 69.

=== Legacy ===
The appearance of the young Georges Washington is known from a painting, The oath of La Fayette at the Fête de la Fédération, 14 July 1790, in which he is standing on the right alongside his father. The painting is on display at the Musée Carnavalet.

== See also ==
- Franco-American alliance
- La Fayette family
- President's House (Philadelphia) – third Presidential mansion
