= Visit of the Marquis de Lafayette to the United States =

1824–25 tour by Revolutionary War general de Lafayette

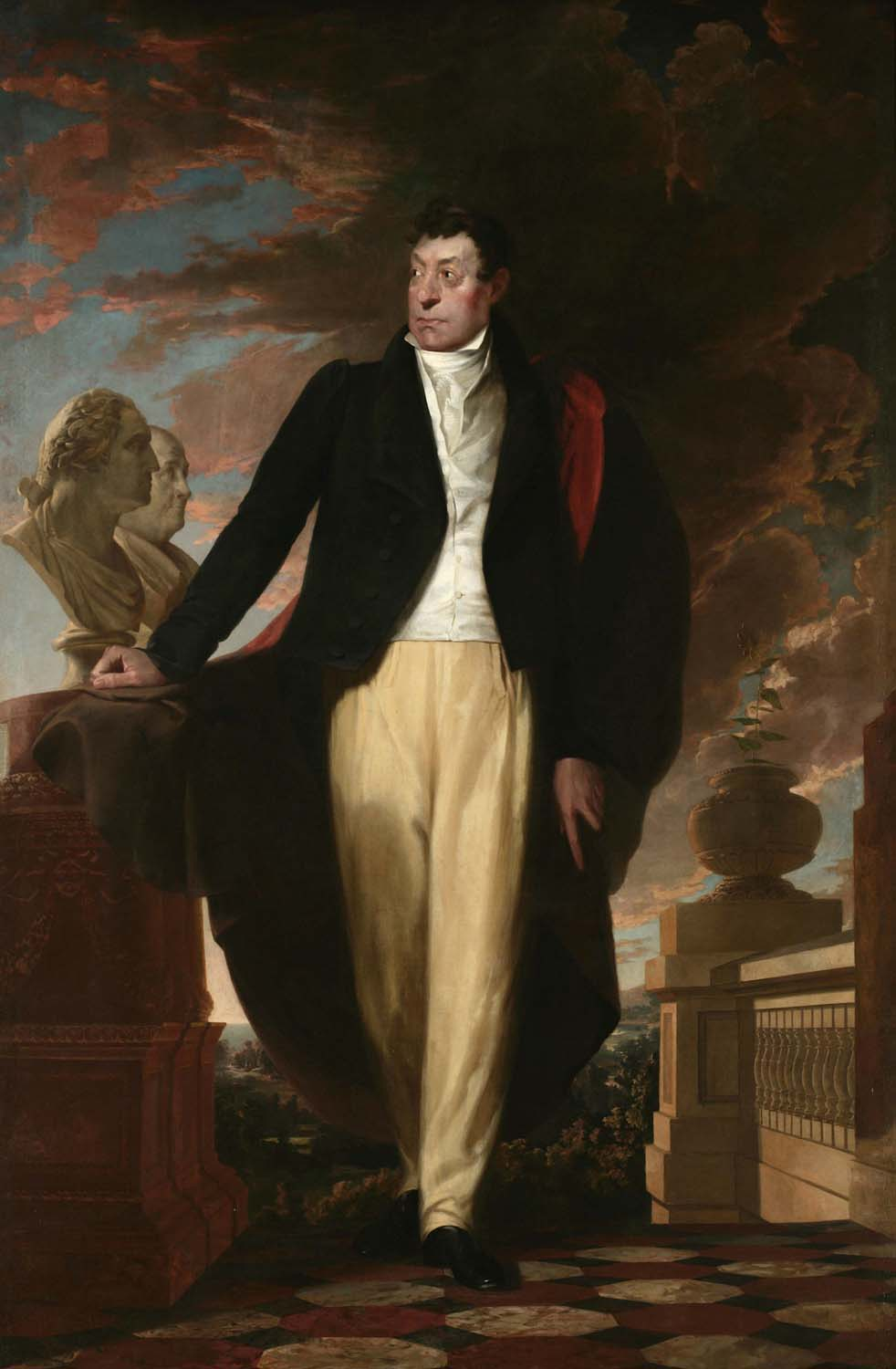
Portrait of General Lafayette by Samuel Morse in 1826

From July 1824 to September 1825, the French Marquis de Lafayette (Marie-Joseph Paul Yves Roch Gilbert du Motier de La Fayette), the last surviving major general of the American Revolutionary War, made a tour of the 24 states in the United States. He was received by the populace with a hero's welcome at many stops, and many honors and monuments were presented to commemorate and memorialize the visit.

== Background ==
External videos
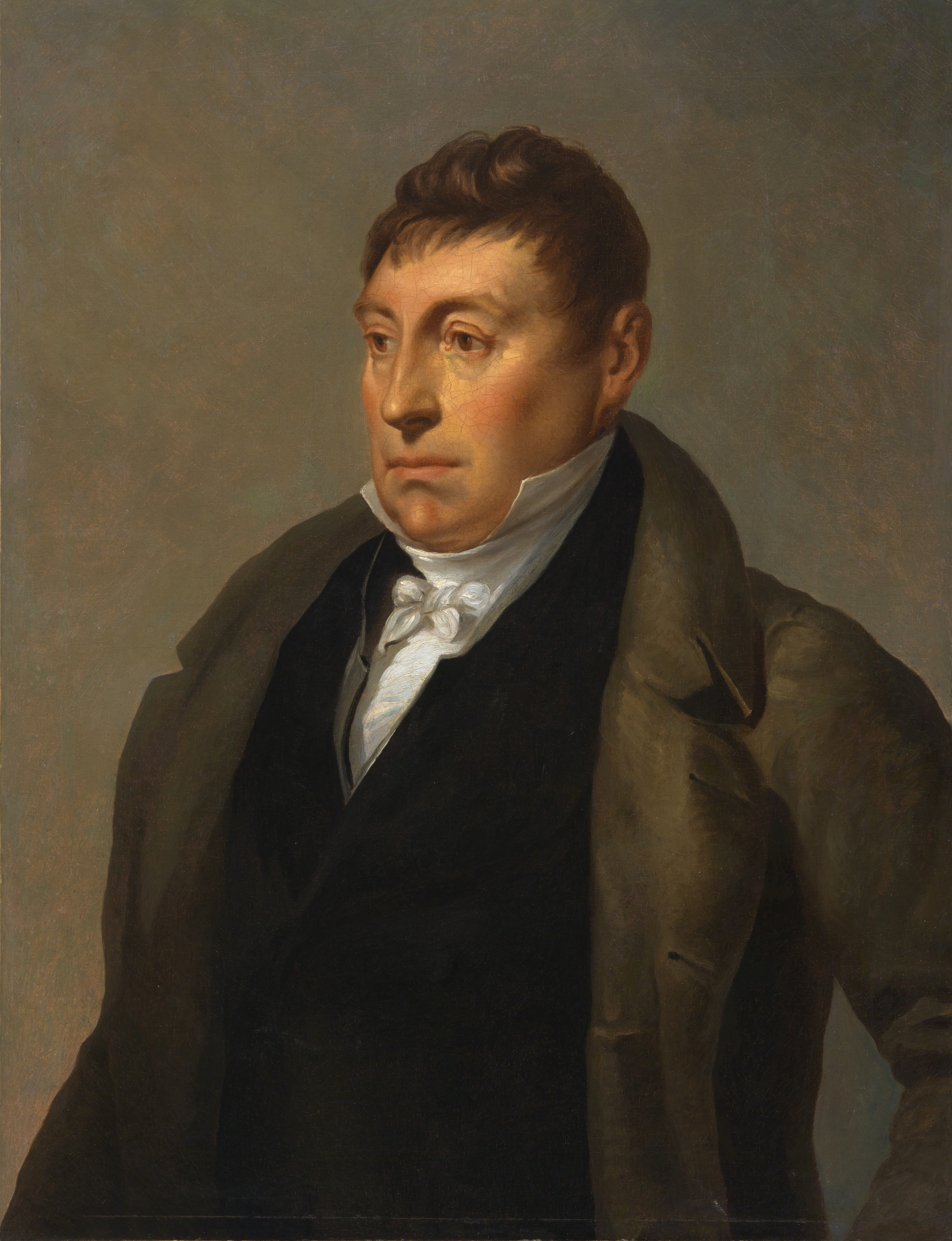
- 1825 portrait by Ary Scheffer
- Lafayette in America, 1824–1825, Alan R. Hoffman lectures on the Grand Tour, 1:03:14

Lafayette led troops under the command of George Washington in the American Revolution nearly 50 years earlier, and he fought in several crucial battles, including the Battle of Brandywine in Pennsylvania and the Siege of Yorktown in Virginia. He had then returned to France and pursued a political career championing the ideals of liberty that the American republic represented.

He helped to write the Declaration of the Rights of Man and of the Citizen with Thomas Jefferson's assistance, which was inspired by the United States Declaration of Independence. He also advocated the end of slavery, in keeping with the philosophy of natural rights. After the storming of the Bastille in July 1789, he was appointed commander-in-chief of France's National Guard and tried to steer a middle course through the years of the French Revolution. In August 1792, radical factions of the revolution took control of the government and ordered Lafayette's arrest, so he fled to the Austrian Netherlands. He was captured by Austrian troops and spent more than five years in prison. Lafayette returned to France after Napoleon Bonaparte secured his release in 1797, though he refused to participate in Napoleon's government or his military conquests. After the Bourbon Restoration of 1814, he became a liberal member of the Chamber of Deputies, a position which he held for most of the remainder of his life.

The Bourbon constitutional monarchy had been restored in France for at least ten years, but King Louis XVIII was reliant on a wheelchair in the spring of 1824 and suffering from severe health issues that proved fatal by late summer. Further, Lafayette was being monitored by the dying king. Lafayette left the French legislature in 1824, and President James Monroe invited him to tour the United States, partly to instill the "spirit of 1776" in the next generation of Americans and partly to celebrate the nation's 50th anniversary.

Lafayette visited all of the American states and traveled more than 6,000 miles (9,656 km), accompanied by his son Georges Washington de La Fayette, named after George Washington, and others. He was also accompanied for part of the trip by social reformer Frances Wright. The main means of transportation were stagecoach, horseback, canal barge, and steamboat.

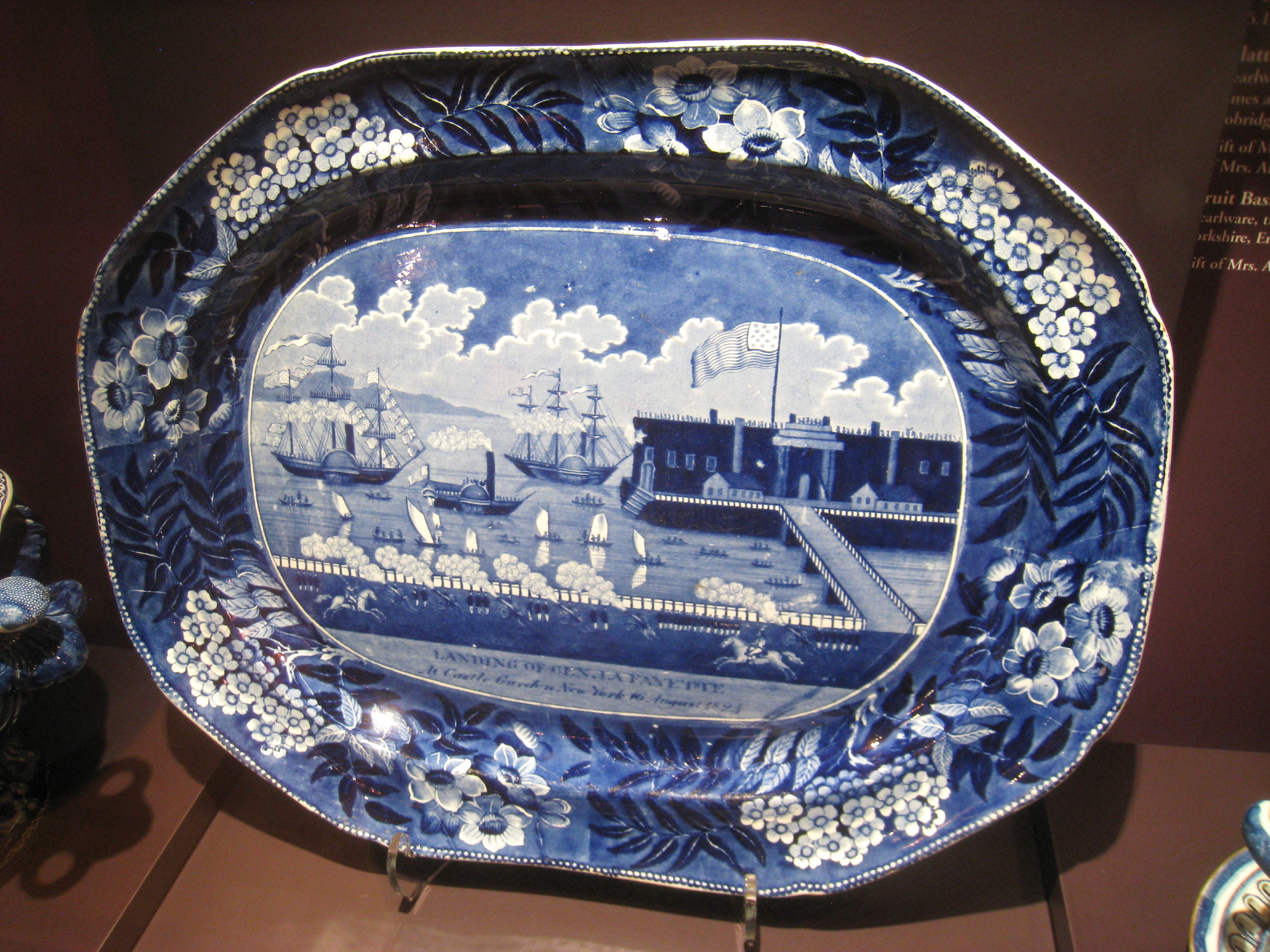
Landing of General Lafayette at Castle Garden, New York, August 16, 1824

Different cities celebrated in different ways. Some held parades or conducted an artillery salute. In some places, school children were brought to welcome the Marquis. Veterans from the war, some of whom were in their sixties and seventies, welcomed the Marquis, and some dined with him. While touring Yorktown, he recognized and embraced James Armistead Lafayette, a free man of color who adopted his last name to honor the Marquis (he was the first US double agent spy); the story of the event was reported by the Richmond Enquirer. More than a century later, various towns continued to honor their own "Lafayette Day".

== Timeline ==
Lafayette left France on the American merchant vessel Cadmus, on July 13, 1824, and his tour began on August 15, 1824, when he arrived at Staten Island, New York. He toured the northern and eastern United States in the fall of 1824, including stops at Monticello to visit Thomas Jefferson and Washington, D.C., where he was received at the White House by President James Monroe. He began his tour of the southern United States in March 1825, arriving at the Fort Mitchell, Alabama crossing of the Chattahoochee River on March 31.

A lighthouse clock made by Simon Willard to commemorate Lafayette's visit to the White House

=== 1824 ===
- July 13 – Lafayette leaves France on the Cadmus
- August 15 – Arrives at Staten Island, New York
- August 16 – Arrives in New York City, landing at Castle Garden (see Lafayette Welcoming Parade of 1824)
- August 20 – Leaves New York City and travels to Bridgeport, Connecticut, stopping along the way in Harlem and New Rochelle, New York, Byram Bridge and Putnam Hill in Greenwich, Connecticut, Stamford, Norwalk, Saugatuck (Westport), and Fairfield, Connecticut, staying at the Washington Hotel in Bridgeport
- August 21–24 – Makes stops in New Haven and Old Saybrook, Connecticut, Providence, Rhode Island, Stoughton, Massachusetts, and Boston
- August 25 – Arrives in Cambridge, Massachusetts, visits former President John Adams at his estate of Peacefield in Quincy, Massachusetts
- August 31 – Leaves Boston, making stops at Lexington, Concord, Chelsea, Salem, Marblehead, and Newburyport, Massachusetts

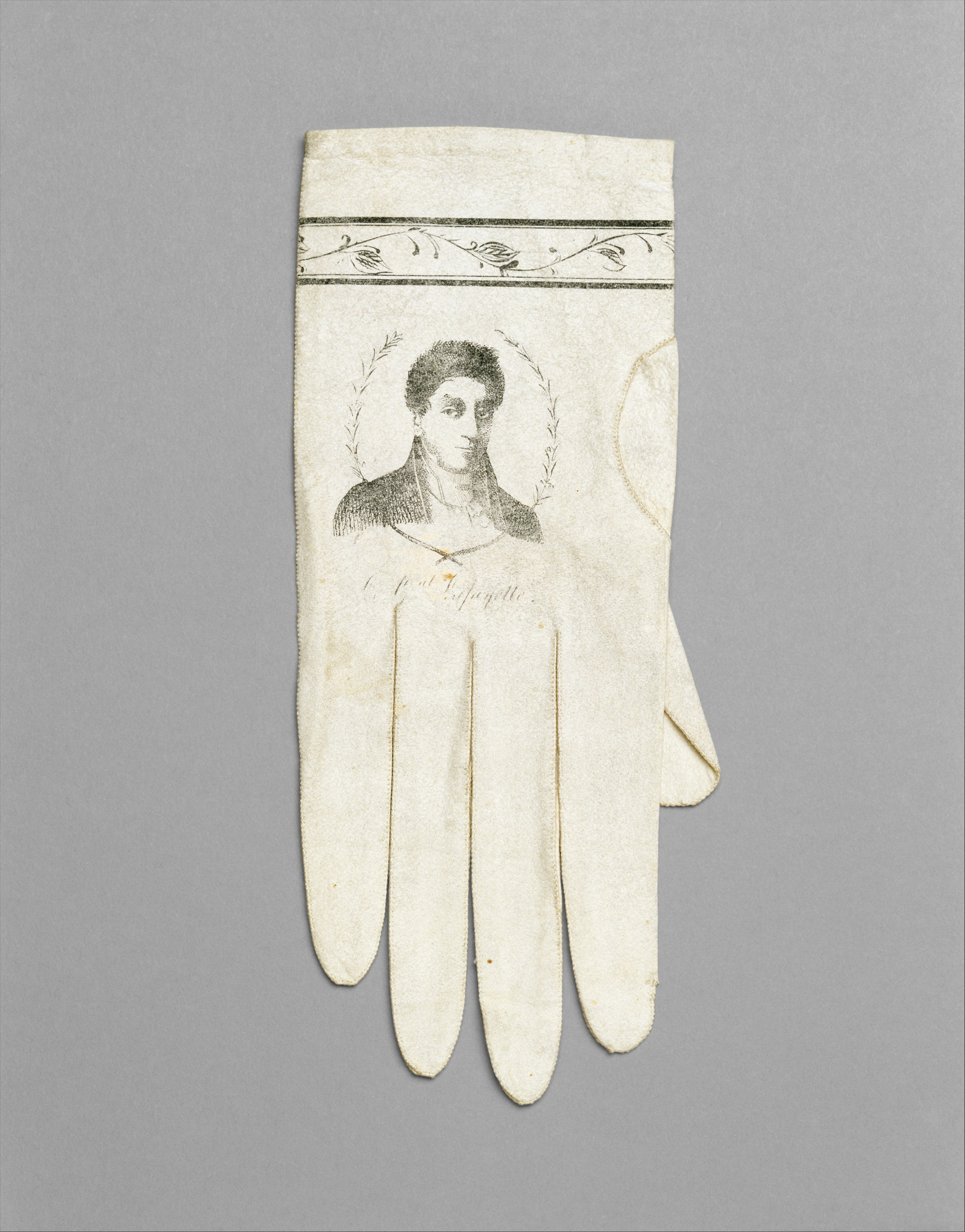
Gloves portraying Lafayette, possibly commemorating his visit to the United States in 1824

- September 1 – Visits Portsmouth, New Hampshire
- September 2 – Visits Boston and Lexington, Massachusetts
- September 3 – Visits Lancaster, Massachusetts, Worcester, Massachusetts and Tolland, Connecticut
- September 4 – Visits Hartford and Middletown, Connecticut
- September 5 – Arrives in New York City
- September 8 – Inspects the fortifications at the Narrows and dined at Fort Lafayette
- September 10 – Visits African Free School No. 2 on Mulberry Street; celebrated with a short speech by 11-year old pupil James McCune Smith, later a prominent anti-slavery scholar, writer, and physician.
- September 11 – Celebrates the 47th anniversary of the Battle of Brandywine with French residents of New York; Is conferred with the Royal Arch degree and various Knights Templar degrees by Freemasons
- September 13 – Visits Newburgh, New York on the beginning of a week long trip up Hudson River
- September 15 – Arrives at West Point via the steamboat James Kent and has dinner with cadets
- September 16 – Visits Poughkeepsie, New York
- September 17 – Visits Catskill, New York and stops in Hudson
- September 18 – Visits Troy, New York and stops to meet with Emma Willard and see her school
- September 19 – Stops in Red Hook, New York and visits Janet Montgomery at her home Montgomery Place. Also stops in Fishkill Landing on the return to New York City. At Fishkill Landing he is welcomed at the home of Caroline De Windt, granddaughter of former U.S. President John Adams
- September 20 – A dinner is held in his honor at Washington Hall by the Grand Lodge of New York of Freemasons.
- September 23 – Visits Bergen Hotel in Bergen (now Jersey City) and presented with a cane made from the wood of a local apple tree at the Van Wagenen House where he met with George Washington during the American Revolutionary War.
- September 24 – Visits the Peace Tavern at Rahway, New Jersey
- September 28 – Visit to Philadelphia with a parade followed by speeches at the State House (Independence Hall) under Philadelphia architect William Strickland's Triumphal Arches

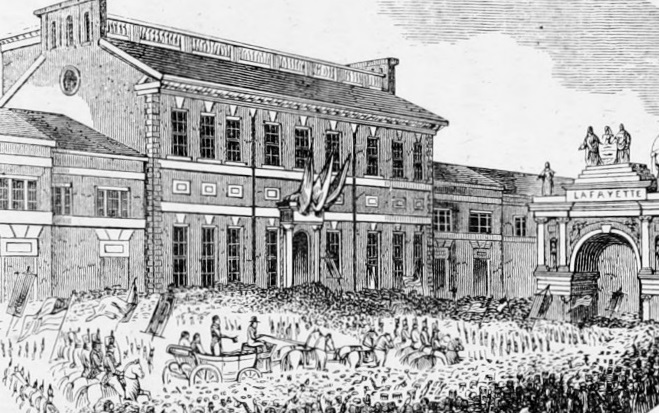
Lafayette's welcoming parade in Philadelphia

- October 6 – Escorted to Wilmington, Delaware, by the Grand Lodge of Delaware Masons
- October 8 to October 11 – Toured Baltimore and met with surviving officers and soldiers of the Revolution
- October 12 – Arrives in Washington, D.C., paraded into town, welcomed by the mayor in the U.S. Capitol rotunda, and celebrated with illuminations throughout the city and with a rocket show.
- October 15 – Spends the entire evening at Arlington House, although he returns to his hotel in Washington, D.C., at night
- October 17 – Visits Mount Vernon and George Washington's tomb in Virginia
- October 18–19 – Arrives by steamer in Petersburg, Virginia, for visit to Yorktown and festivities marking the 43rd anniversary of the battle; spent eight days in the Tidewater of Virginia (Norfolk and Portsmouth) area. This was one of his longest stays of the grand tour because it was the site of the American and French victory over the British at Yorktown. He arrived in Yorktown on October 18 on a ship where a water-borne honor guard escorted him to a specially constructed Yorktown wharf, where he was greeted by a crowd of 15,000 people. Gov. James Pleasants and Virginia militia general Robert Barraud Taylor (of the 1813 Battle of Craney Island) gave speeches in his honor. During the visit, the party visited temporary monuments, including a 45-foot tall arch at the site of his courageous assault at Redoubt #10 and a 76-foot tall obelisk at the site of the British surrender. A mass assembly greeted him at Surrender Field. He visited Williamsburg, Virginia and the College of William & Mary from October 19–22 and stayed in the Peyton Randolph House in Williamsburg. He attended an honorary banquet at Raleigh Tavern with Chief Justice John Marshall and Secretary of War John Calhoun. His party rode to Jamestown, Virginia and traveled to Portsmouth to see Norfolk Naval Shipyard. While in Hampton Roads, he visited the unfinished Fort Monroe, and then Colonel Abraham Eustis escorted him to inspect the Old Point Comfort stronghold, which had been designed by French-born engineer Simon Bernard.
- October 22 – Arrives in Norfolk, Virginia via steamer from Petersburg. Celebrations involve a ball in the (now demolished) custom house. Spends four days there, and in Portsmouth
- October 25 – Arrives in Richmond, Virginia, on a steamer from Norfolk. Lafayette briefly reunites with James Armistead Lafayette when he spots him amongst the crowd of people.
- On November 2 – Left Richmond for Monticello to visit Jefferson
- November 8 – Attends a public banquet at the University of Virginia in Charlottesville
- November 20, 21, 22 – visits Fredericksburg, Virginia with several parties in his honor, including two in City Hall, now the Fredericksburg Area Museum. The following week he expected to spend time at Woodlawn near Mount Vernon, and at Mount Vernon. He expected to be in Annapolis on December 15.
- Early December – Stays in Washington, D.C., visiting the White House, meeting several times with President Monroe and George Washington's relatives; visits the Washington Navy Yard
- December 8 and 9 – Makes official visits to the Senate and addresses Congress at the House of Representatives
- December 15 – Feted at the first commencement ceremony of the Columbian College in the District of Columbia (now the George Washington University)
- December 17 – Arrives at Annapolis, Maryland, at 3 pm, is received in the Senate chamber and visits Fort Severn
- December 20 – Received at the Maryland State House
- December 29 – Arrives at the Jug Bridge crossing the Monocacy River on the National Road east of Frederick, Maryland. Stayed in Frederick through the morning of December 31.

=== 1825 ===
- January 1 – Attends a banquet hosted by Congress
- January 19 – Visits Baltimore and leaves January 20 on a steamboat bound for Norfolk, on his way to visit the legislature of Virginia at Richmond
- January 31 – Visits Perseverance Lodge #21 Harrisburg, Pennsylvania
- February 23, 1825 – Sets off on the southern leg of his tour Because the route from Richmond to Raleigh was by carriage over poor roads, the traveling party was obliged to take the sandy "Lower Road" by Suffolk and Halifax.
- February 25 – Interviewed by Poulson's Advertiser, a Philadelphia newspaper, recalls his wound at Brandywine
- February 26 – Overnight stop at the Indian Queen Inn in Murfreesboro, North Carolina
- February 27 – Traveled to Northampton Court House (present-day Jackson, North Carolina) where he met the official North Carolina greeting party and stayed at Eagle Tavern in Halifax, North Carolina.
- February 28 – Traveled through Enfield, North Carolina, with a brief stop at the home of Joseph Branch and across the Tar River at the falls and spent the night at Col. Allen Rogers' Tavern at Rogers Crossroads in eastern Wake County, North Carolina
- March 1 – Viewed Canova's statue, George Washington, at the North Carolina State House.
- March 2–3 – Stayed in Raleigh, where he was reunited with Colonel William Polk who fought beside him at the Battle of Brandywine where both were wounded
- March 4–5 - Visited his namesake town Fayetteville, North Carolina. Admirers stood in mud and pouring rain to welcome him. He was feted with a formal dinner, a ball, and multiple military displays.
- March 15 – Arrives in Charleston, South Carolina, and enjoys three days of balls, fireworks, and reunions; is reunited with Francis Kinloch Huger, who is the son of his comrade Benjamin Huger and who tried to free Lafayette from an Austrian prison around 1795
- March 18 – Arrived in Beaufort, South Carolina, to a 13-gun salute and speaks to citizens from the John Mark Verdier House

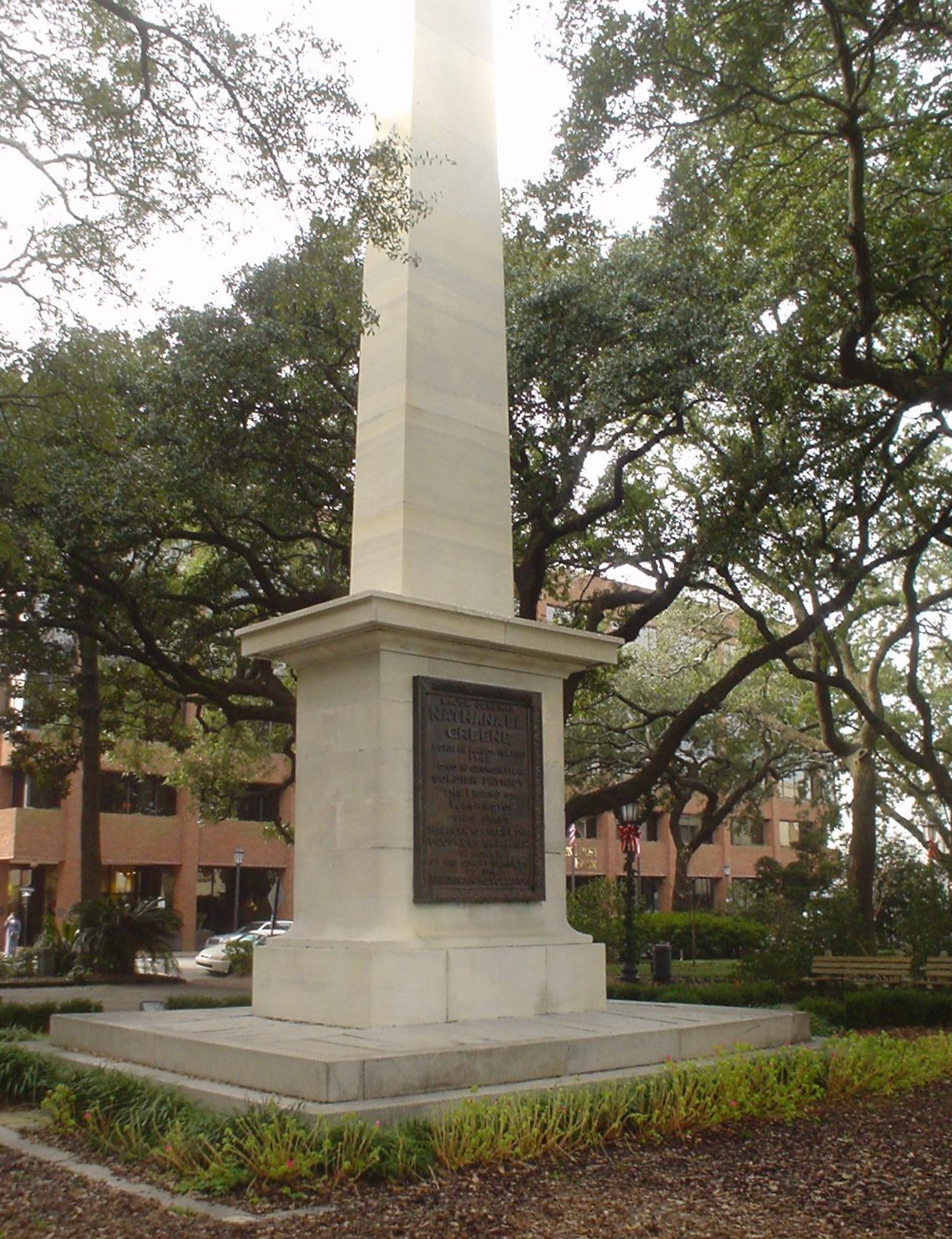
Nathanael Greene Monument in Johnson Square

- March 19 – Arrived in Savannah, Georgia, and speaks to citizens from the Owens–Thomas House
- March 21 – Lays the cornerstone for a memorial to General Nathanael Greene
- March 23 – Traveled up the Savannah River by steamboat to Augusta, Georgia
- March 25 – Traveled along the Milledgeville Stage Road to Warrenton, Georgia
- March 26 – Continued on to Sparta, Georgia
- March 27 – Arrived in Milledgeville, Georgia where he meets with the Governor George Troup in an elaborate reception and feast at the Capitol grounds
- March 29 – Travels to Macon, Georgia, and visits the Old Creek Indian agency in Crawford County, Georgia
- March 30 – Spends the night in a bark-covered log cabin in Chattahoochee County, Georgia
- March 31 – Crosses the Chattahoochee River into Alabama and stays in Fort Mitchell, they begin their route west to Montgomery on the Federal Road via military escort through Creek territory
- April 3 – Arrived in Montgomery
- April 4–6 – Party boards the Balize and the Henderson and makes its way over the Alabama River through Selma, Alabama, through the capital city of Cahaba, then meets with members of the French Vine and Olive Colony near Demopolis, then makes an overnight visit to Claiborne, where Lafayette is entertained at a ball in the Masonic Lodge.
- April 7 – Arrived in Mobile, Alabama
- April 9 – Governor Israel Pickens accompanies Lafayette by steamboat down Mobile Bay to Mobile Point, where he joins an official welcoming party from Louisiana, then boards the steamer Natchez which takes him to New Orleans
- April 10 – Arrived in Chalmette, Louisiana, site of the 1815 Battle of New Orleans, lodges in The Cabildo, site of the Louisiana Purchase transfer ceremonies in 1803
- April 15 – Departs New Orleans on the steamer Natchez up the Mississippi River towards Baton Rouge, Louisiana
- April 16 – Baton Rouge for a reception and banquet, leaving just before nightfall
- April 18 – Stopped at Natchez, Mississippi
- April 28 – Natchez ties up for the evening at Carondelet, Missouri
- April 29 – Visits St. Louis, Missouri
- April 30 – Governor Edward Coles hosts Lafayette in Kaskaskia, Illinois, once the French capital of Upper Louisiana; dignitaries included Pierre Menard and William Stephen Hamilton, son of Alexander Hamilton
- May 4 – Arrived in Nashville, Tennessee, housed at Boyd McNairy's house; his boat landed at the mouth of Broad Street, where it was greeted by a large crowd and a cannon-fire salute. According to one memoir, "He was taken from the boat to an open carriage drawn by six white horses. Lafayette and Gen. Jackson sat on the back seat, and his son, George Washington Lafayette, and his aid-de-camp, Barnard, sat on the front seat...At night the entire town was illuminated. Mrs. Littlefield, a daughter of Gen. Greene, knew Gen. Lafayette when he was at their house, where he was brought when he was wounded during the revolutionary war."
- May 7 – Stopped in Shawneetown, Illinois
- May 8–9 – Their steamboat Mechanic sinks on the Ohio River; all passengers reach shore safely, but Lafayette loses property and money; the party is picked up the following day by the passing steamboat Paragon
- May 11 – Spent a day in Jeffersonville, Indiana, returned to Louisville, Kentucky that evening
- May 14 – Attended dinner and a ball in Frankfort, Kentucky
- May 15 – Spent the night at the home of Major John Keene, five miles from Lexington, Kentucky
- May 16–17 – Attended a military parade and spoke at Transylvania University and the Lexington Female Academy in Lexington
- May 18 – Arrived in Georgetown, Kentucky
- May 19–20 – Stayed in Cincinnati, Ohio
- May 21 – Arrived in Maysville, Kentucky
- May 22 – Visited the Our House Tavern in Gallipolis, Ohio
- May 23 – Visited Marietta, Ohio stopping overnight at the residence of Nahum Ward.
- May 24 – Visited Wheeling, Virginia

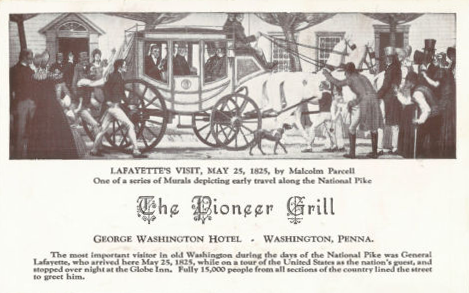
A postcard celebrating the 1825 visit of LaFayette, bearing a painting by Malcolm Parcell

- May 25 – Visited Washington, Pennsylvania, dining at The George Washington Hotel and staying at the Globe Inn
- May 26 - Visited Uniontown, Pennsylvania, greeted by Albert Gallatin at the Fayette County Courthouse.
- May 29 – Visited Brownsville, Pennsylvania attended a meeting of Brownsville Lodge No. 60 F&AM and dinner held in his honor.
- May 29 – Visited Braddock, Pennsylvania
- May 30–31 – Stayed in Pittsburgh
- June 1 – Arrived in Butler, Pennsylvania
- June 2 – Stayed overnight in Waterford at Reed's Hotel. After breakfast shown Eagle Hotel (under construction) Escorted to Erie by Colonel Colt and distinguished party.
- June 3 – Visited the home of Judah Colt (Burgess of Erie) Erie, Pennsylvania
- June 4 – Gave speech at Eagle Tavern, Lafayette Square, Buffalo, and follows part of the uncompleted Erie Canal from Buffalo across New York
- June 5 – Visits Niagara Falls
- June 7 – Met Revolutionary War veterans at Silvius Hoard's Tavern, Rochester, New York
- June 9 – Visits Syracuse
- June 11- Traveling via packet boat on the Erie Canal he stopped in Schenectady to meet with Mayor Isaac Schermerhorn and dined at the Givens Hotel
- June 12- Stopped in Albany and visited with Governor Joseph Yates
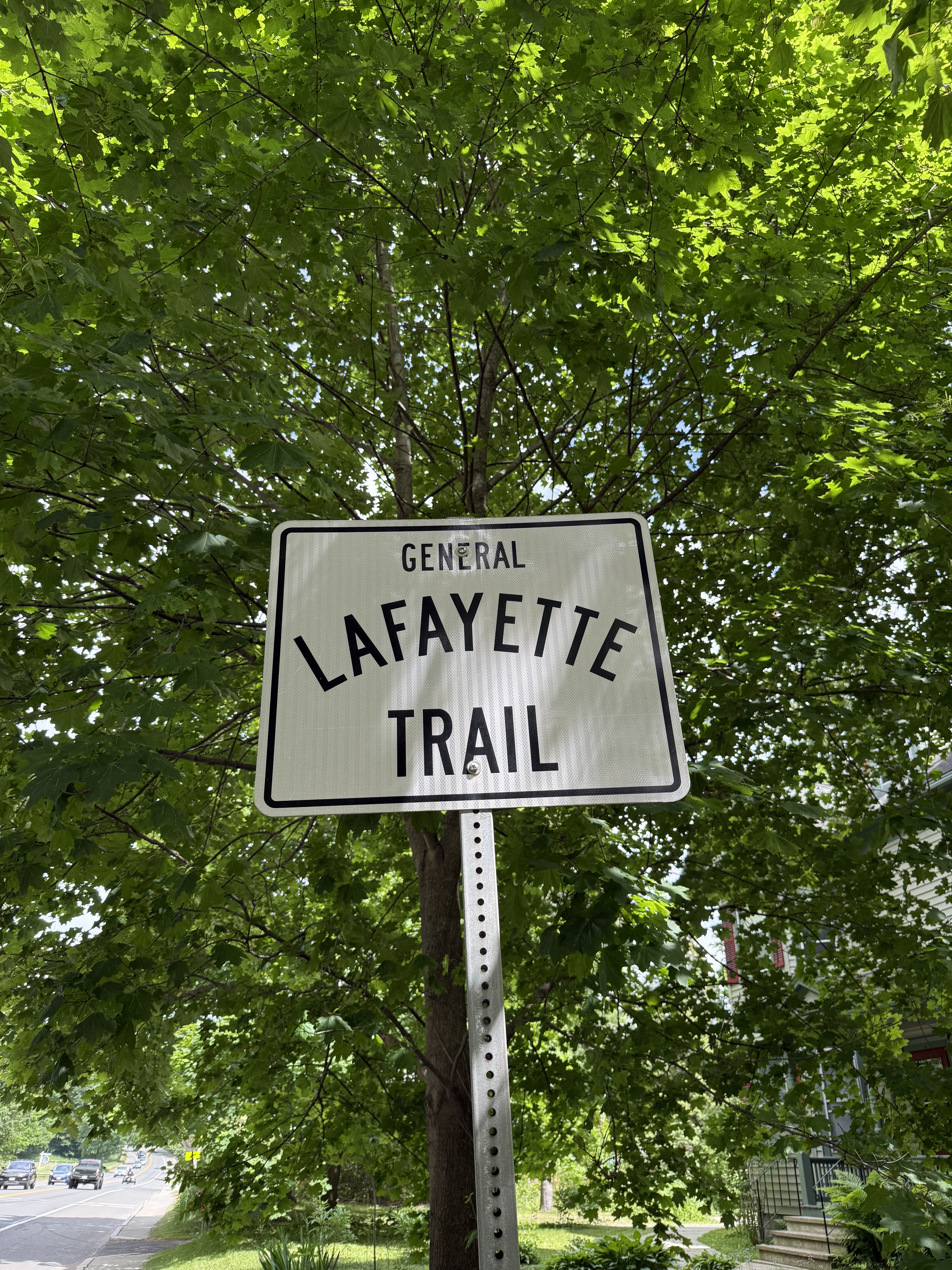
  Sign marking the General Lafayette Trail on Route 8 at the Pittsfield and Dalton, MA town line

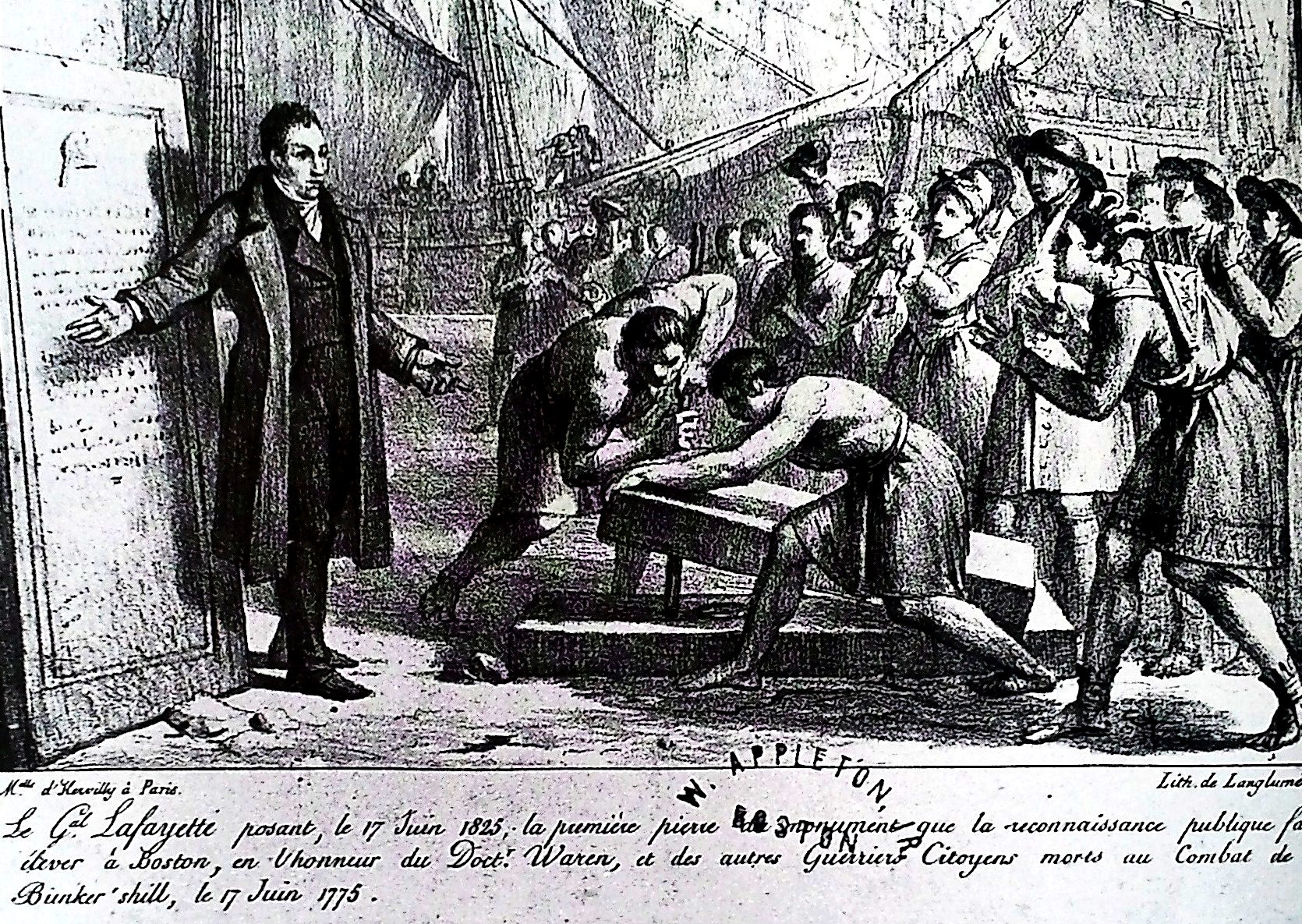
Lafayette laying cornerstone of Bunker Hill Monument June 17, 1825

- June 13 – Arrived in Pittsfield, Massachusetts, and was received and gave speech to an audience at the Congregational Church located in the Park Square Historic District (Pittsfield, Massachusetts) later dining at Joseph Merrick Coffee House before leaving.
- June 17 – Laid the cornerstone of the Bunker Hill Monument during celebration of the 50th anniversary of the Battle of Bunker Hill in Charlestown, Boston, Massachusetts, accompanied by Daniel Webster, who gives a rousing speech
- June 22 – Dover, New Hampshire
- June 23 – Arrived in South Berwick, Maine and spent the day in Saco, Maine and Biddeford, Maine.
- June 24 – Scarborough, Maine at 7AM and then at 9AM was welcomed at Portland, Maine, by Maine governor Albion Parris, Bowdoin College President William Henry Allen, Henry Wadsworth Longfellow's father Stephen Longfellow.
- Sunday, June 27 – Arrived in Concord, New Hampshire, Hopkinton, New Hampshire, and Claremont, New Hampshire

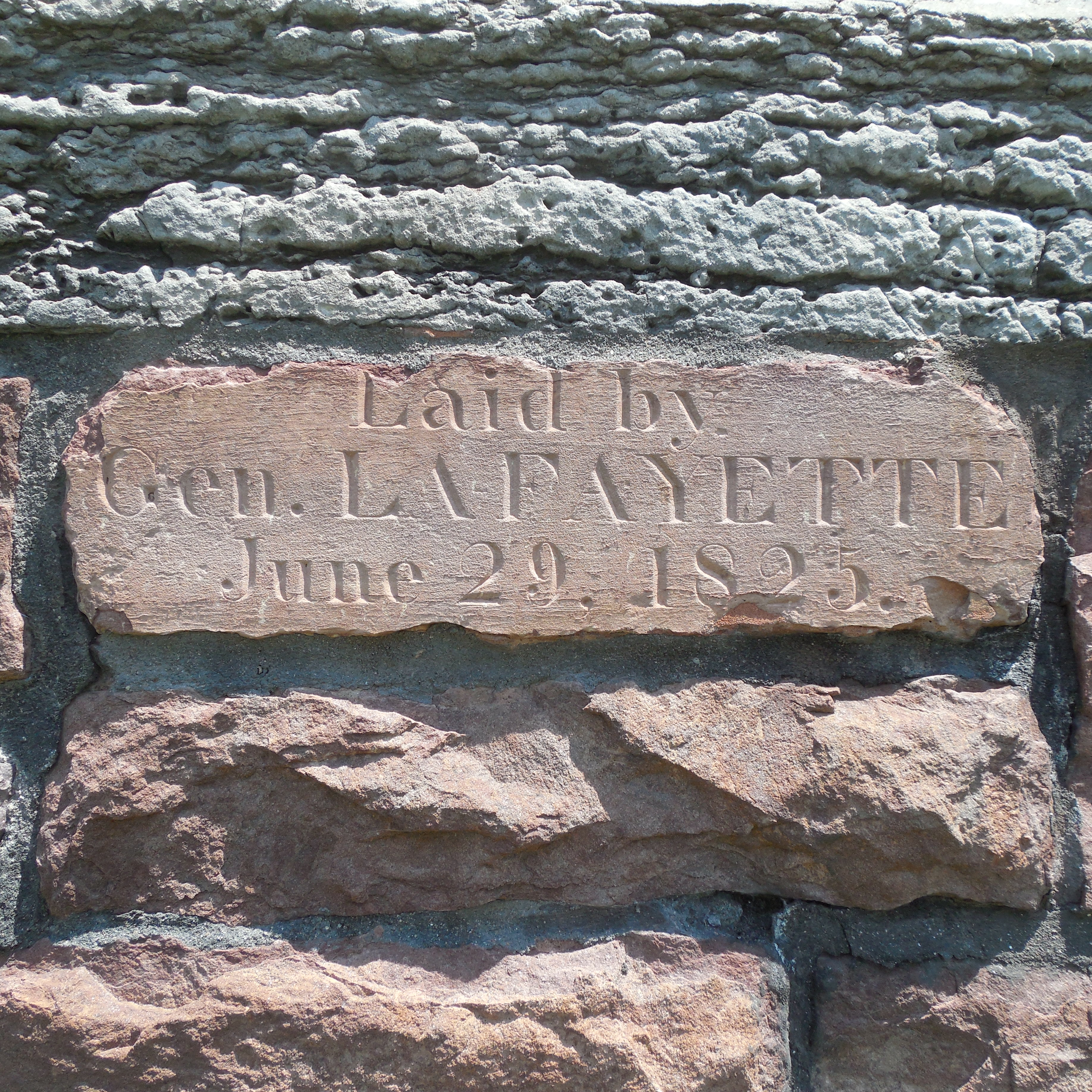
Original cornerstone of "South College" in Burlington

- June 28 – Crossed into Vermont at the Cornish Bridge, passing through Woodstock and taking a stagecoach through the mountains to Barnard and Royalton, Vermont. He passes through Randolph; here he is said to have met a young Justin S. Morrill and eventual Senator Dudley Chase. He is escorted with Governor Cornelius P. Van Ness and others through Barre to large festivities in Montpelier that include speeches by Supreme Court Judge Elijah Paine and others. He spends the night in Montpelier at The Pavilion.
- June 29 – Lafayette meets with women's groups and then departs Montpelier for Burlington, Vermont, arriving there about 11:00am. He lays the cornerstone for the "South College" building at the University of Vermont and gives a talk to about 50–60 students. He is entertained at the Grasse Mount estate. He departs 12 hours after he arrives for Whitehall, New York.
- July 2 – Makes a second visit to West Point
- July 14 – Lafayette attends a banquet held in his honor at Sansay House in Morristown, New Jersey.
- July 15 – Lafayette attends a reception at Waverly House in then Bottle Hill, now Madison, New Jersey, on his way to Springfield.
- July 16 – Lafayette arrives in Philadelphia for his second visit of the tour on SS Delaware from Bordentown, New Jersey.
- July 20 – Lafayette visits Germantown and Chestnut Hill, near Philadelphia. He specifically visited Wyck Historic House and Cliveden.
- July 25 – Lafayette leaves Philadelphia on the SS Delaware for Wilmington, Delaware.
- July 26 – Lafayette departs Chester, Pennsylvania, for the Brandywine Battlefield, ending the day in West Chester.
- July 27 – Departs West Chester for Lancaster, Pennsylvania.
- Late July – Departs Lancaster for Baltimore, Maryland, via Port Deposit and Havre de Grace, Maryland. Spends two days in Baltimore.
- August 6 – Traveled with President John Quincy Adams to Loudoun County, Virginia, to visit former president James Monroe at Oak Hill. Remained until August 9, then toured the nearby town of Leesburg.
- August 23 – Lafayette attends celebratory dinner hosted by Richard Basye in Jeffersonton, Virginia.
- Late August – Lafayette returns to Mount Vernon.
- September 6 – Lafayette arrives in Washington, D.C., where he meets the new U.S. President John Quincy Adams, addresses a joint session of Congress and celebrates his 68th birthday at a White House banquet with President Adams.
- September 7 – Lafayette leaves Washington, D.C., en route to France on the frigate USS Brandywine.

== Honors received during the trip ==
Fayetteville, North Carolina was named after Lafayette in 1783, before the trip. The College of William and Mary conferred upon him the honorary degree of Doctor of Laws on October 20, 1824. Late in the trip, he again received honorary citizenship of Maryland. (Note: Lafayette was already a "natural born" American citizen via his pre-Constitution Maryland citizenship.) Congress voted him $200,000 and a township of land in Tallahassee, Florida, known as the Lafayette Land Grant. On 9 October 1824 Lafayette received an honorary Doctor of Laws from the University of Maryland's School of Medicine. A round plaque is affixed to the spot where the honor was conferred in Davidge Hall in Baltimore, Maryland.

== 1824: Visit to Monticello ==
Lafayette arrived at Monticello on November 4 in a carriage provided by Jefferson with a military escort of 120 men. Jefferson waited outside on the front portico. By this time some 200 friends and neighbors had also arrived for the event. Lafayette's carriage pulled up to the front lawn where a bugle sounded the arrival of the procession with its revolutionary banners waving. Lafayette was advanced in age and slowly stepped down from the carriage. Jefferson was 81 and in ill health, and he slowly descended the front steps and began making his way towards his old friend. His grandson Randolph was present and witnessed the historic reunion: "As they approached each other, their uncertain gait quickened itself into a shuffling run, and exclaiming, 'Ah Jefferson!' 'Ah Lafayette!', they burst into tears as they fell into each other's arms." Everyone in attendance stood in respectful silence, many of them stifling sobs of their own. Jefferson and Lafayette then retired to the privacy of the house and began reminiscing over the many events and encounters which they shared years before.

The next morning, Jefferson, Lafayette, and James Madison rode to the Central Hotel in Charlottesville in Jefferson's landau. They were escorted by mounted troops and followed by the local townspeople and other friends. They were greeted and honored with speeches, then departed the hotel at noon and set out for a banquet at the University of Virginia which Jefferson was anxious for Lafayette to see; he had postponed the commencement of classes for the event. After a three-hour dinner, Jefferson had someone read a speech that he had prepared for Lafayette, as his voice was weak and could not carry very far. This was Jefferson's last public speech. Lafayette later accepted Jefferson's invitation for honorary membership to the university's Jefferson Literary and Debating Society. Lafayette bid Jefferson goodbye after an 11-day visit.

== 1825: Return to France ==
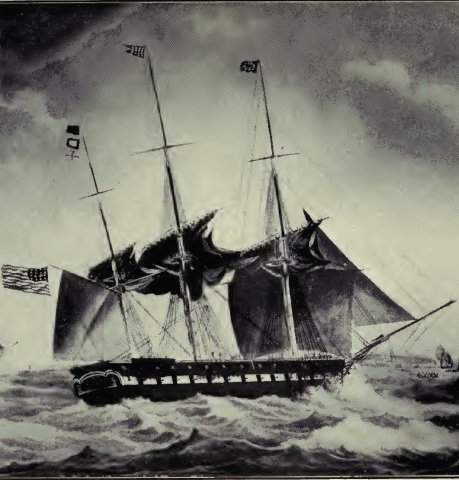
Lafayette returned to France aboard the USS Brandywine

Lafayette had expressed his intention of sailing for home sometime in the late summer or early autumn of 1825. President John Quincy Adams decided to have an American warship carry him back to Europe, and he chose a recently built 44-gun frigate named Susquehanna for this honor. However, it was renamed USS Brandywine to commemorate the battle in which the Frenchman had shed his blood for American freedom and as a gesture of the nation's affection for Lafayette. Brandywine was launched on June 16, 1825, and christened by Sailing Master Marmaduke Dove; she was commissioned on August 25, 1825, with Captain Charles Morris in command.

Lafayette enjoyed a last state dinner to celebrate his 68th birthday on the evening of September 6, and then embarked in the steamboat Mount Vernon on the 7th for the trip downriver to join Brandywine. On the 8th, the frigate stood out of the Potomac River and sailed down Chesapeake Bay toward the open ocean. As he sat on the Brandywine ready to depart, General Isaac Fletcher conveyed greetings from Revolutionary War compatriot General William Barton, and also explained that Barton had been in debtors' prison in Danville, Vermont, for 14 years. Lafayette promptly paid Barton's fine and thus allowed him to return to his family in Rhode Island.

After a stormy three weeks at sea, the warship arrived off Le Havre, France, early in October, and, following some initial trepidation about the government's attitude toward Lafayette's return to a France now ruled by King Charles X, Brandywine's honored passenger returned home.

In 1829, Auguste Levasseur, Lafayette's private secretary, published his travel's notes and memoirs in two volumes with the title of Lafayette en Amérique, en 1824 et 1825 ou Journal d'un voyage aux États-Unis. That same year, one translation appeared in German and two in English (New York City and Philadelphia), titled Lafayette in America in 1824 and 1825: Journal of a Voyage to the United States. A fourth translation, this time in Dutch, was published in 1831. Since then, Levasseur's work has been an important source of information to historians.

== Bibliography ==
- Levasseur, Auguste (1829). Lafayette in America, in 1824 and 1825: or, Journal of travels, in the United States, Volume I. Philadelphia: White, Gallaher & White.
- Levasseur, Auguste (1829). Lafayette in America, in 1824 and 1825: or, Journal of travels, in the United States, Volume II. Philadelphia: White, Gallaher & White.
