= Perdue Hill, Alabama =

- Unincorporated community
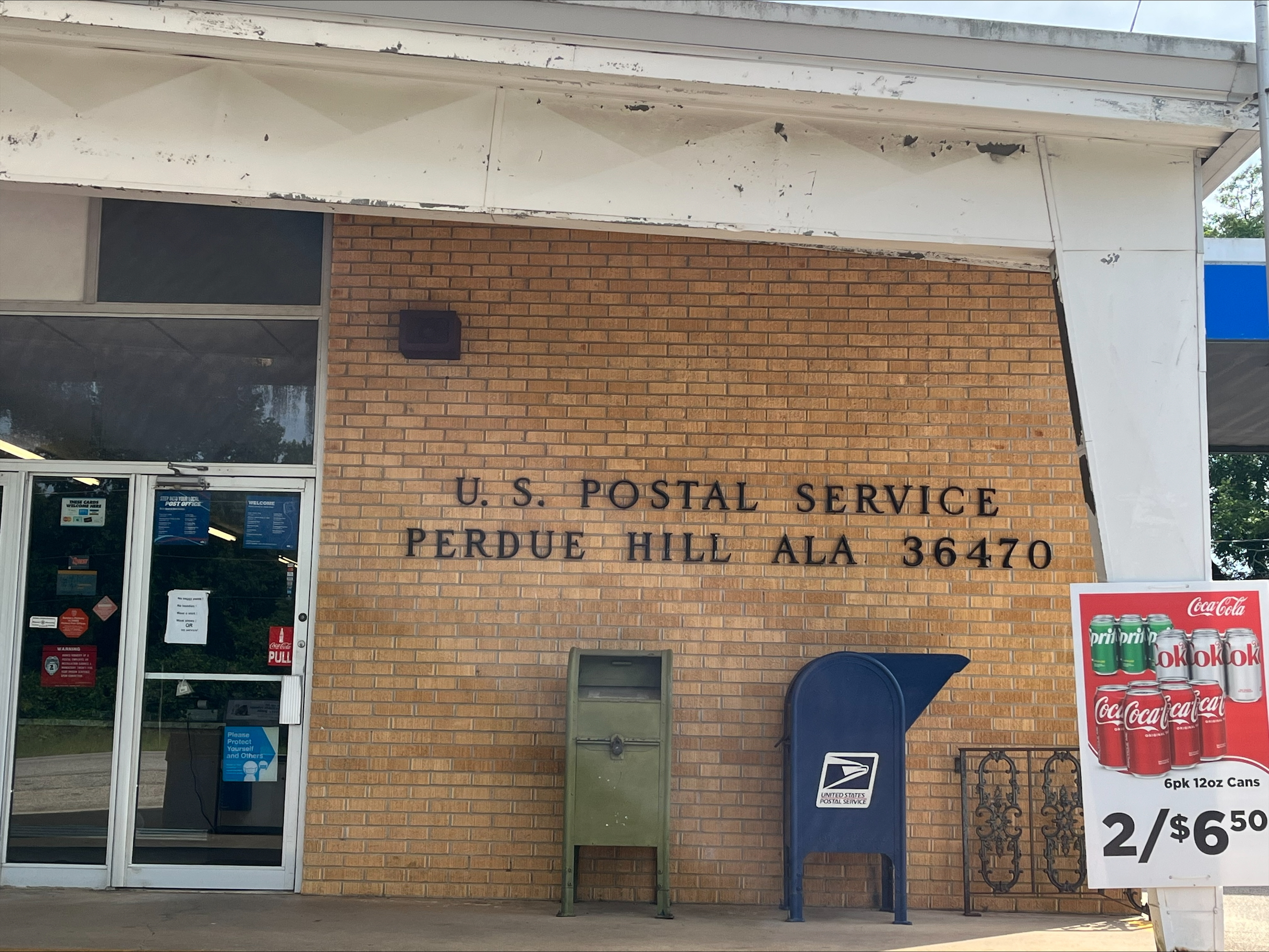
- Perdue Hill Post Office

- Location within Alabama Location within the United States
- Coordinates: 31°30′50″N 87°29′35″W
- Country: United States
- State: Alabama
- County: Monroe
- Elevation: 384 ft (117 m)
- Time zone: UTC-6 (Central (CST))
  - Summer (DST): UTC-5 (CDT)
- ZIP code: 36470
- Area code: 251

Perdue Hill is an unincorporated community in Monroe County, Alabama. It has one site listed on the Alabama Register of Landmarks and Heritage, the Perdue Hill Masonic Lodge. The home of William B. Travis is located along U.S. Route 84 in Perdue Hill and was moved here in 1985 from Claiborne.

== Demographics ==
Historical population
Census	Pop.	Note	%±
1880	110		—
1890	282		156.4%
U.S. Decennial Census

Perdue Hill was listed on the 1880 and 1890 U.S. Censuses. In 1890, it was the only community separately returned in Monroe County, hence making it the largest community. It did not appear on the census again after 1890.

== Geography ==
Perdue Hill is located at 31.51405°N 87.49332°W and has an elevation of 384 feet (117 m).
