= Eagle Tavern (Halifax, North Carolina) =

- U.S. National Register of Historic Places
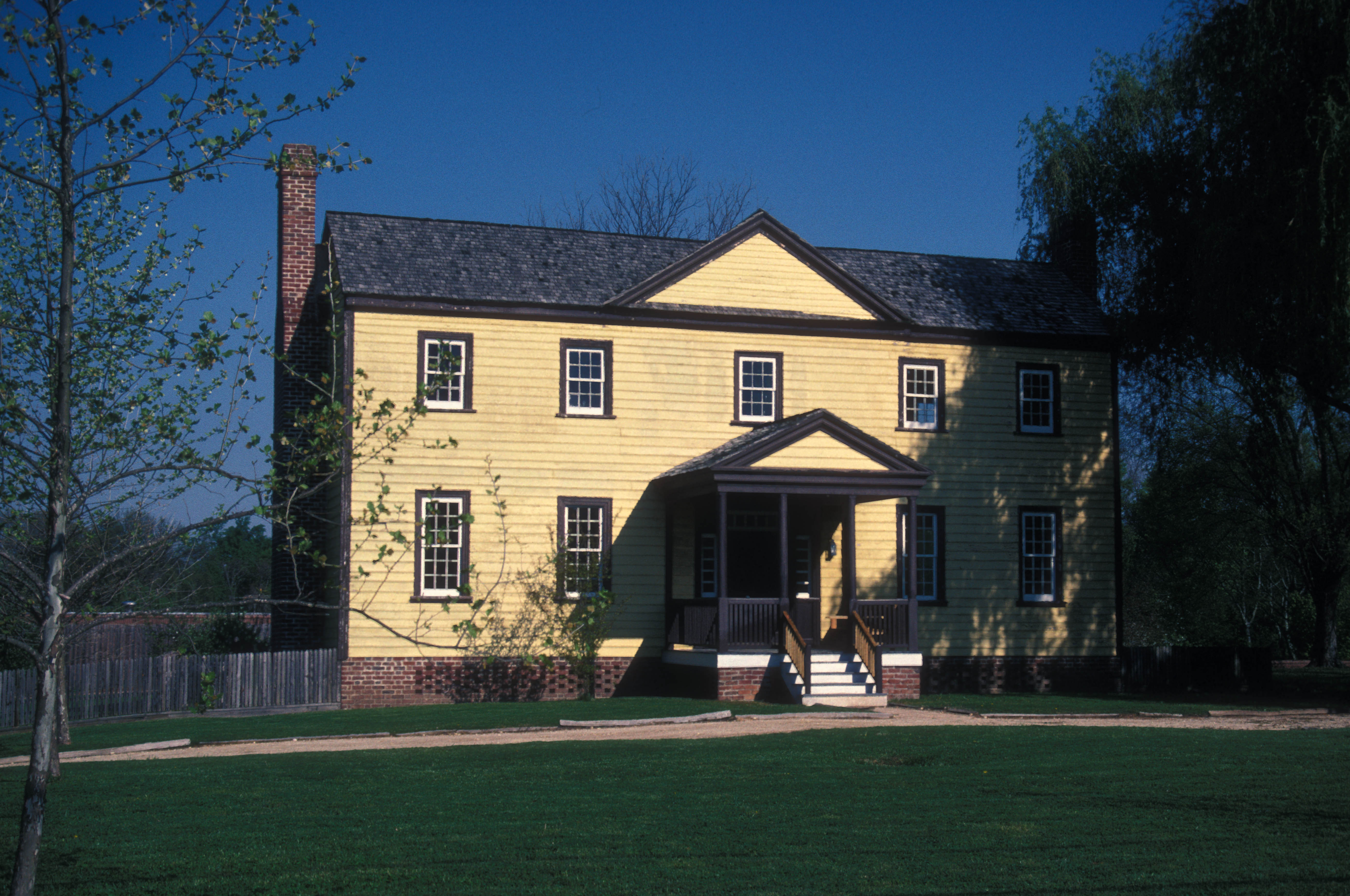

- Location within North Carolina Location within the United States
- Location: Main St., Halifax, North Carolina
- Coordinates: 36°19′47″N 77°35′20″W
- Area: less than one acre
- NRHP reference No.: 73001349
- Added to NRHP: April 24, 1973

The Eagle Tavern is a historic tavern built in the 1790s in Halifax, Halifax County, North Carolina. The tavern (known as the "Eagle Hotel" in the 1820s) served as an overnight stop for the official traveling party during the visit of the Marquis de Lafayette to the United States. The tavern is demarcated as "E-68" on the North Carolina Highway Historical Marker Program. It is a two-story, pedimented, T-shaped tripartite frame building. Previously located on the lot next to the Church of the Immaculate Conception Catholic Church at 145 South King Street in Halifax and acquired by the merchant Michael Ferrall in 1838, the Eagle Tavern was donated to the Catholic Diocese of Raleigh in the 1963 will of Nannie Gary, a great granddaughter of Michael Ferrall, who then lived in the Eagle Tavern. After accepting the gift from Nannie Gary’s estate after her death in 1969 the Diocese determined that it was not feasible to use the Ferrall house (Eagle Tavern) for charitable or religious purposes. The house was then conveyed to the Historic Halifax Restoration Association and the house was moved up King Street in the 1970s to the location of the Halifax Visitors Center where it was restored and interpreted as a museum in the style of the “Eagle Tavern”.

== History ==
According to local tradition, George Washington stayed at the tavern while surveying the Dismal Swamp Canal. William Hooper also supposedly lived there for a time. When Willie Jones declined the opportunity to host Washington during his visit in 1791, Washington again stayed at the tavern, hosted by John Ashe.

The Marquis de Lafayette stayed at the tavern when he visited Halifax on February 27, 1825 during his travel through the United States, and a banquet was held at the tavern in his honor. The banquet was hosted by Richard Eppes and John Branch.

It was listed on the National Register of Historic Places in 1973.
