= Woodstock Observer =

Former American newspaper

- Founder: David Watson
- Founded: January 11, 1820; 205 years ago
- Ceased publication: 1833
- Political alignment: Jeffersonian
- City: Woodstock, Vermont, United States

The Woodstock Observer was a newspaper published in Woodstock, Vermont. Its debut issue was dated January 11, 1820.

== History ==
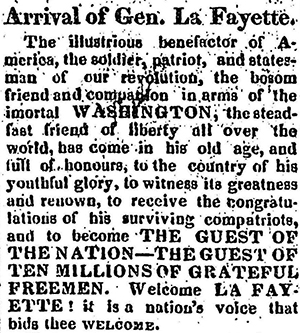
An account in the Woodstock Observer of the Marquis de Lafayette's arrival in New York in 1824

The Woodstock Observer's founder, as well as first editor and publisher, was David Watson. Trained as a printer, Watson established the newspaper in 1820, two years after settling in Woodstock. He transferred ownership of the paper in 1823 to Rufus Colton who expanded its coverage and renamed it the Woodstock Observer and Windsor and Orange County Gazette. By 1828 Colton reported that the receipts from subscriptions and advertising were not sufficient to meet the paper's expenses and his decision to continue publishing was only in the hope conditions might improve. They did not, and the newspaper ceased publication in June 1832.

The Woodstock Observer marked the second attempt to establish a newspaper in Woodstock, an earlier effort having also failed. Back issues of the Woodstock Observer, and of the Woodstock Observer and Windsor and Orange County Gazette, are archived by the Library of Congress.

=== Staff ===
Aside from Watson and Colton's editorship of the paper, assistant editors were Benjamin F. Kendall (1827–1828) and B.F. Fellows (1830), among others.

== Editorial position ==
An editorial statement penned by Watson for the debut issue affirmed the paper's intent to be strictly non-partisan:

Since the political elements of our government have ceased to war with each other; and since those of the European world are generally marked with the same character – no political animadiversions shall be admitted into our paper, tainted, in the slightest degree, with the acrimony of party.

Under Colton's management, however, the paper came to take an editorial line supportive of the National Republican Party. In 1829 another Vermont newspaper, the North Star, accused the Woodstock Observer of being a "little Masonic pop-gun" owing to its vocal opposition to the Anti-Masonic Party. (Rufus Colton was, himself, a Master Mason.)
