= Lafayette Welcoming Parade of 1824 (Philadelphia) =

Parade welcoming the Marquis de Lafayette to Philadelphia

Lafayette Welcoming Parade
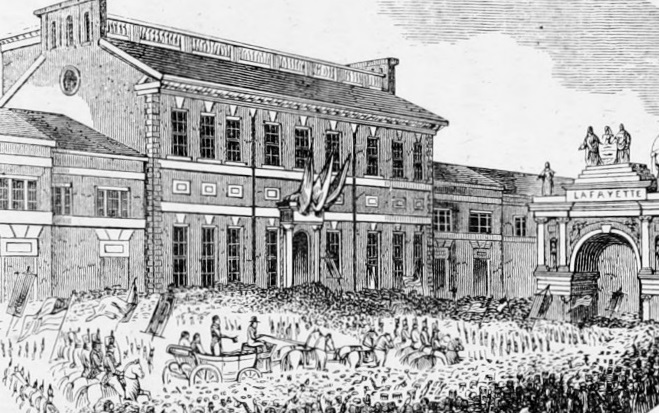
- The Marquis de Lafayette enters Philadelphia in 1824.
- Date: September 28, 1824
- Location: Philadelphia, Pennsylvania, United States
- Type: parade
- Organized by: City of Philadelphia
- Participants: Marquis de Lafayette

The Lafayette Welcoming Parade of 1824 was a parade held in Philadelphia in September 1824 to welcome the arrival of the Marquis de Lafayette on the occasion of his visit to the United States for a sixteen-month tour.

== Background ==
In 1824 the Marquis de Lafayette, a Frenchman, was the last surviving general of the American War of Independence. That year, the United States Congress issued a formal invitation for him to visit the United States. Penned by President James Monroe, it informed the marquis that "the whole nation ardently desire to see you again among them". News that Lafayette had responded favorably to the congressional invitation prompted a flurry of articles in the leading newspapers of the nation issuing increasingly hysterical appeals for the organization of lavish celebrations, including one popular suggestion that every town from "Maine to Louisiana" fire simultaneous artillery salutes once word had arrived Lafayette had set foot on American territory. Lafayette was called "the greatest man in the world" in some press reports.

== Parade ==
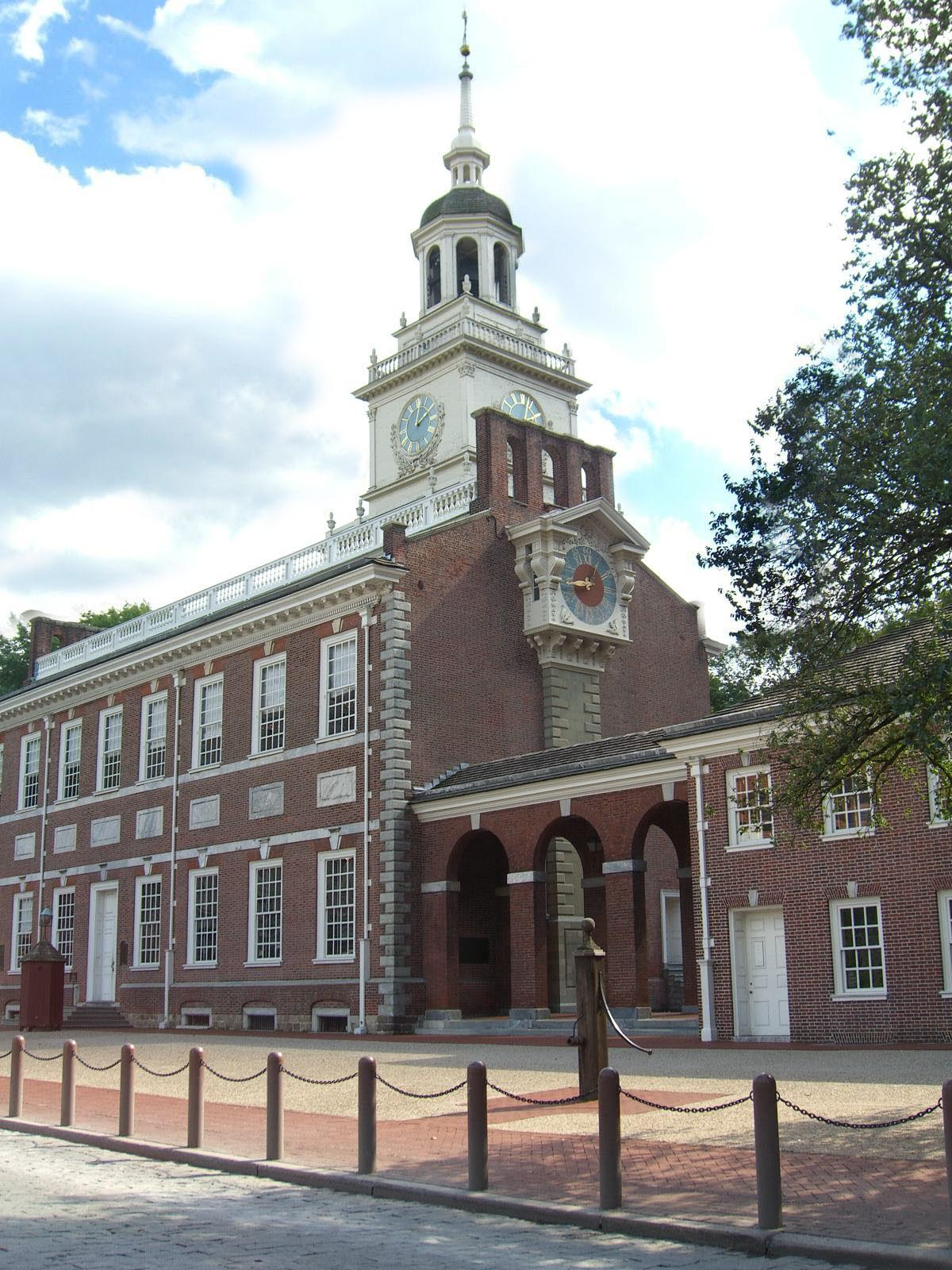
The parade ended at Independence Hall, pictured here in 2006.

Lafayette and his entourage arrived on the outskirts of Philadelphia on September 27, 1824 and were entertained with an evening ball in Holmesburg, Pennsylvania. They spent the night at the Frankford Arsenal. The next day an enormous, 6,000-man military escort drawn from the Pennsylvania militia was assembled. At 8:00 a.m. a 100-gun salute was fired to Lafayette who was, thereafter, driven at the head of the troops into the city in a carriage drawn by six white horses. The marquis' secretary, Auguste Levasseur, described the scene in a journal he kept of the tour:

Never could it be more truly said that a whole population came out to meet Lafayette; none remained at home but those who age and feebleness detained. Stages had been erected on each side of the street, as high as the eves of houses, for the accommodation of spectators.

The three-mile-long procession that accompanied Lafayette into the city wound through a dozen temporary triumphal arches that had been constructed for the occasion. Aging veterans of the Revolution had assembled outside the Second Bank of the United States to cheer Lafayette as his coach passed; seeing them he stood and "saluted them most respectfully with three low bows". The parade ultimately terminated at Independence Hall, where a reception was held in his honor.

== Aftermath and significance ==
The Philadelphia welcoming parade for Lafayette has been described as the "most sumptuous pageantry" of all such events held during his tour.

== See also ==
- Lafayette Welcoming Parade of 1824 (New York)
