= Perdue Hill Masonic Lodge =

Historic building in Alabama

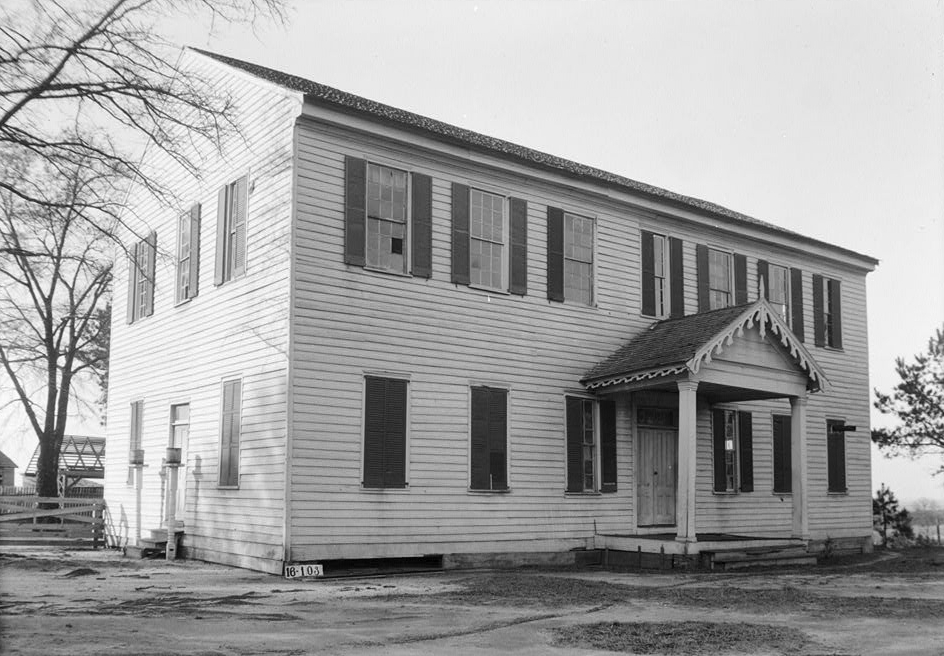
- HABS photo from 1934, after its move from Claiborne

- Location within Alabama Location within the United States
- 31.51677°N 87.49700°W
- Location: Dales Ferry Road and Perdue Hill, Alabama

History
- Built: 1824

Site notes
- Architect: John Parks

Alabama Register of Landmarks and Heritage
- Designated: November 1, 1976

The Perdue Hill Masonic Lodge, also known as Claiborne Masonic Lodge and as Masonic Lodge #3, is a historic Masonic lodge in the unincorporated community of Perdue Hill in Monroe County, Alabama. It was also the Woman's Club of Perdue Hill. Built in 1824, it functioned as both a church and a courtroom. It is listed on the Alabama Register of Landmarks and Heritage as the "Perdue Hill Masonic Lodge". John Parks supervised the construction. It is a frame, gabled building approximately 35 by 60 feet (11 m × 18 m) in plan. It is the oldest building in Monroe County, and one of the oldest surviving institutional buildings in Alabama.

The building was moved in 1884 from Claiborne to the crossroads community of Perdue Hill, about two miles to the south. By around 1930 the Masons no longer used it.

The building was documented in the Historic American Buildings Survey (HABS) in 1934. Three measured drawings were made of it. Historical data on it have been recorded. By 1936 it was home to the Woman's Club of Perdue Hill. It was restored in 1981 and is open for special events as of 2019.

Gilbert du Motier, Marquis de Lafayette attended a dance at the building as he traveled through Alabama in 1825. In 2025, a ceremony was held at the Masonic Lodge to honor the 200th anniversary of this visit.

== Location ==
It is located in Perdue Hill at the intersection of U.S. Route 84 and Dales Ferry Rd.
