= Auguste Levasseur =

French writer and diplomat

André-Nicolas Levasseur (also known as Auguste Levasseur) was a 19th-century French writer and diplomat known in the United States for accompanying the Marquis de La Fayette during his last trip to the Americas and in the Caribbean and Mexico for his involvement in French imperialism.

Levasseur is better known in the English-speaking world as the personal secretary of Gilbert du Motier, Marquis de Lafayette, during his last visit to the United States, from July 1824 to September 1825. In 1829, he published his travel's notes and memoirs in two volumes with the title of Lafayette en Amérique, en 1824 et 1825 ou Journal d'un voyage aux États-Unis. That same year, one translation appeared in German and two in English (New York City and Philadelphia). A fourth translation, this time in Dutch, was published in 1831. Since then, Levasseur's work has been an important source of information to historians. It continues to be cited as an important primary source; particularly as an account's witness of the events surrounding Lafayette's celebrated visit.

After gaining prominence through the publication of Lafayette's memories (or travel log) Levasseur became active in the French international arena. In 1838 he was appointed as consul to Haiti with the tasks of ensuring the indemnity payment that President Jean-Pierre Boyer had agreed in 1825 and of bringing the young Black Republic closer to a protectorate with France.

In 1843, while Haiti struggled between new reform liberal forces and the independence movement in the east, Levasseur involved himself in the internal politics by suggesting to Dominican leaders the idea of becoming a protectorate of France. France would supply money, arms and protection with the condition of giving up Samaná Bay and allowing France to appoint a governor. This plan did not work, and Levasseur is seen today as an example of unwelcome imperial intervention in the postcolonial world for Haitian and Dominican authors alike. Not long after failing as a diplomat in Haiti, Levasseur was appointed again to another French imperial intervention in the Americas: the case of Mexico.

== Sources ==
- Levasseur, Auguste (1829). Lafayette en Amérique, en 1824 et 1825 ou Journal d'un voyage aux États-Unis. Paris: Baudouin. OCLC 654586143.
- Lavasseur, Auguste (1829). Lafayette in America, in 1824 and 1825: or, Journal of travels, in the United States. New York: White, Gallaher & White. OCLC 847833282.
- Levasseur, Auguste (1829). Lafayette in America in 1824 and 1825, or, Journal of a voyage to the United States. Philadelphia: Carey & Lea. OCLC 11584768.
- Levasseur, Auguste (1831). Reis door de Vereenigde Staten van Noord-Amerika : in de jaren 1824 en 1825, door den Generaal Lafayette. Zutphen: W.J. Thieme. OCLC 228669733.
- Levasseur, Auguste (1829). Reise des General Lafayette durch Amerika, in den Jahren 1824 und 1825. Naumburg: Wildsche Verlags-Buchhandlung. OCLC 32677143.
- Turner, Martha L. (Winter 1984). "Lafayette's Tour of Georgia: The Observations of Auguste Levasseur". The Georgia Historical Quarterly. 68 (4): 558–568. OCLC 4897607126.
