= Honors and memorials to the Marquis de Lafayette =

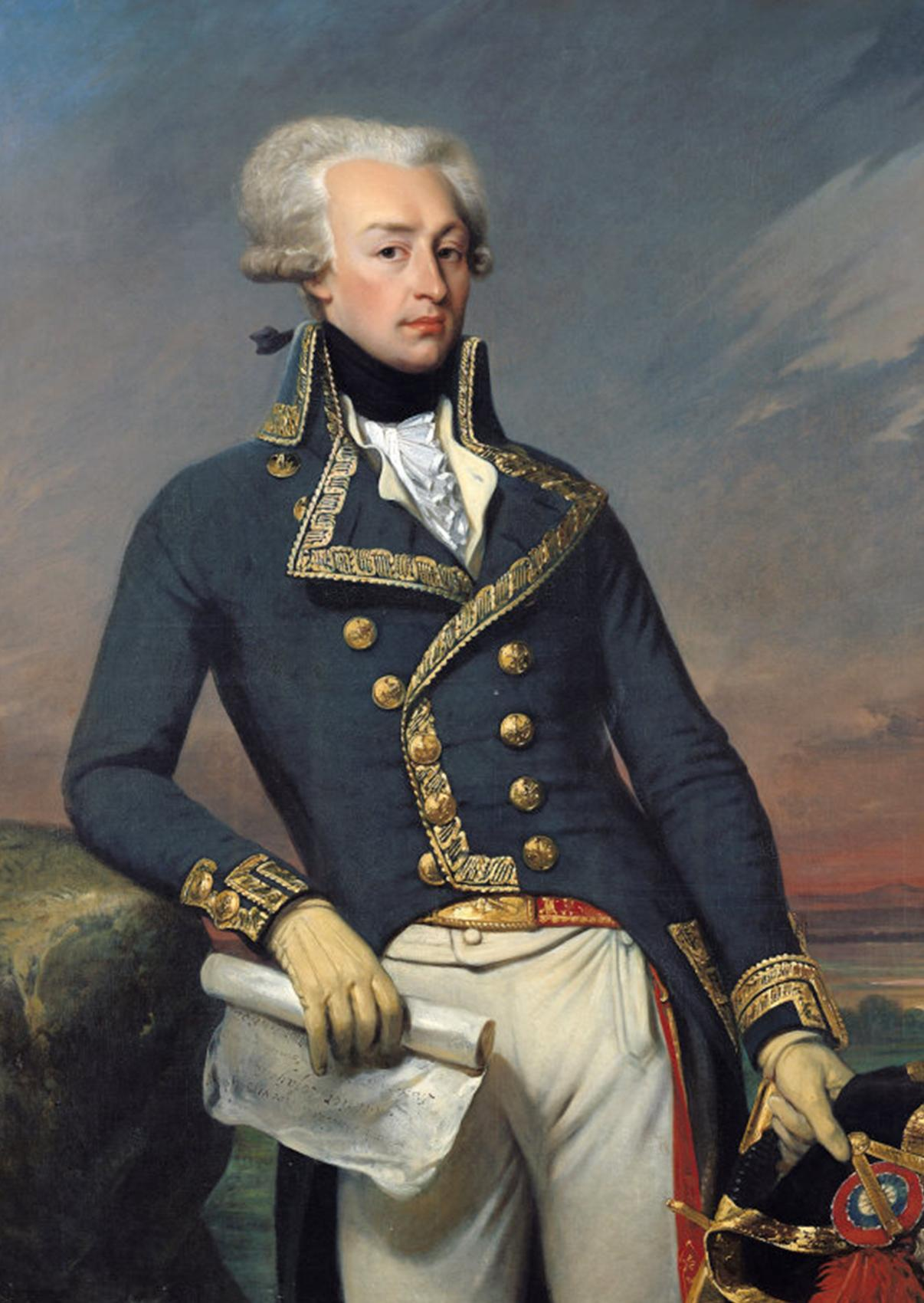

Gilbert du Motier, Marquis de Lafayette (1757–1834), a French aristocrat and Revolutionary War hero, was widely commemorated in the U.S. and elsewhere. Below is a list of the many homages and/or tributes named in his honor:

== Honors ==
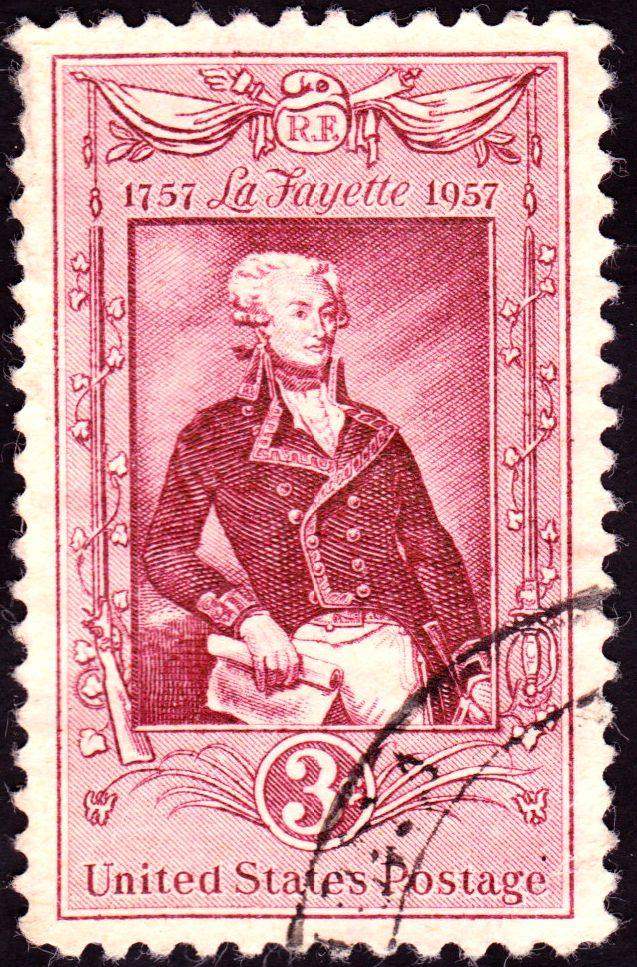
U.S. Postage Stamp, 1957 issue, 3c, commemorating 200th anniversary of the birth of La Fayette

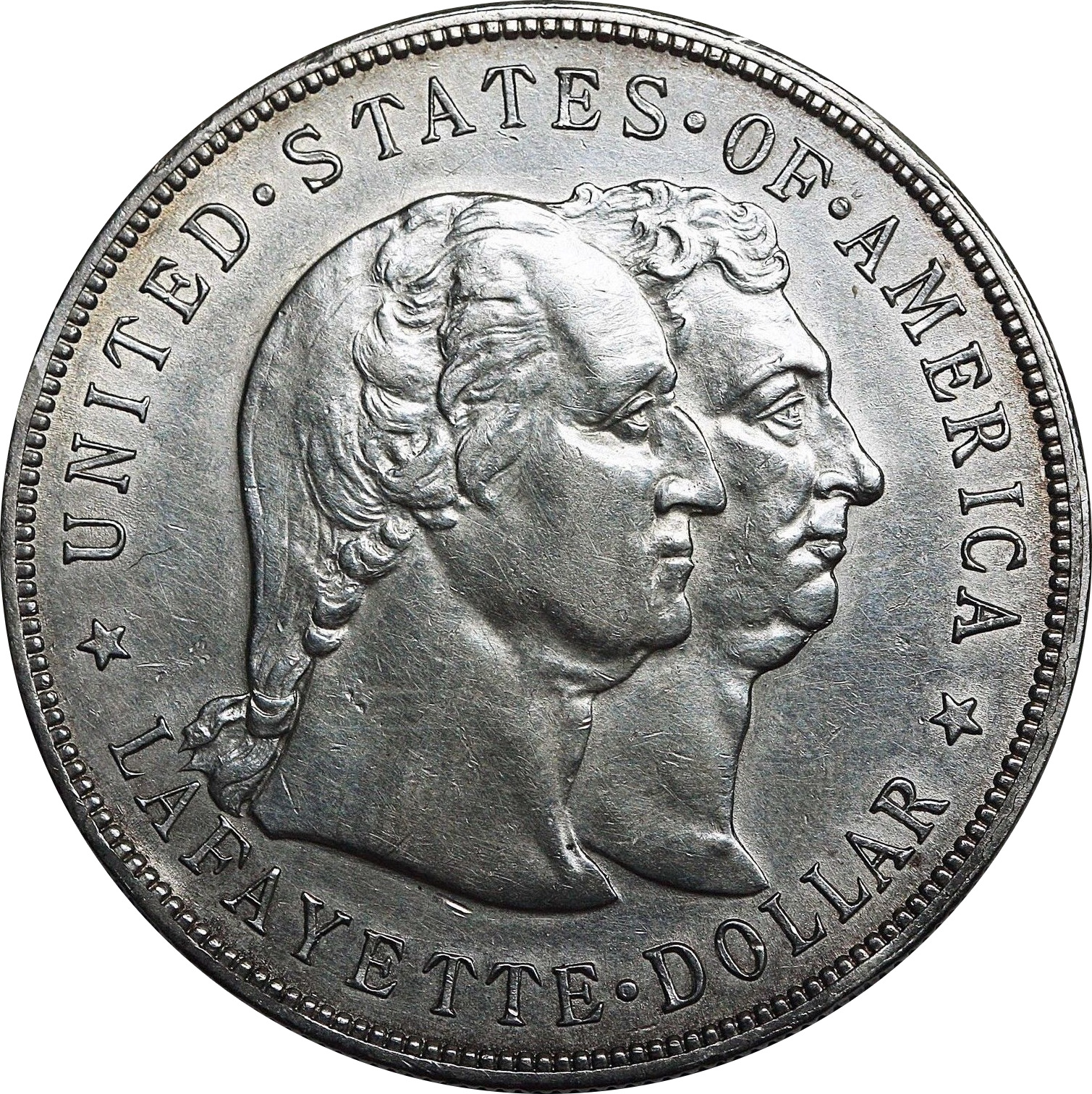
The 1899 Lafayette silver dollar, designed by Charles E. Barber, honors Lafayette and George Washington and is the only U.S. commemorative silver dollar prior to 1983.

- In 1792, James McHenry, whom Lafayette considered a good friend, purchased a tract called Ridgely's Delight about a mile west of Baltimore. On it, he built a country seat on 95 acres and named it Fayetteville in his honor.
- In 1824, the U.S. government named Lafayette Park in his honor; it lies immediately north of the White House in Washington, D.C.
- In 1824, Lafayette was invited back to the United States to commemorate the anniversary of the American Revolution, and visited the Battle of Yorktown battlefield.
- In 1826, Lafayette College was chartered in Easton, Pennsylvania. Lafayette was honored with a monument in New York City in 1917. Portraits display Washington and Lafayette in the chamber of the U.S. House of Representatives. Numerous towns, cities, and counties across the United States were named in his honor.
- In 1831, the French navy surgeon and naturalist René Primevère Lesson honored Lafayette by giving the Sri Lankan junglefowl the scientific name Gallus lafayetii. Hence the spelling lafayetii is considered a lapsus and the corrected spelling G. lafayettii is in common use.
- In 1834, upon Lafayette's death, American President Andrew Jackson ordered that Lafayette be accorded the same funeral honors as John Adams and George Washington. Therefore, 24-gun salutes were fired from military posts and ships, each shot representing a U.S. state. Flags flew at half mast for thirty-five days, and "military officers wore crepe for six months". The Congress hung black in chambers and asked the entire country to dress in black for the next thirty days.
- In 1899, Lafayette appeared with Washington on a U.S. coin, the Lafayette dollar that was minted in 1899 (though showing the year 1900). It was produced to raise money for a statue of him that was erected in Paris.
- On July 4, 1917, shortly after the U.S. entered World War I, Colonel Charles E. Stanton visited the grave of Lafayette and uttered the famous phrase "Lafayette, we are here." After the war, a U.S. flag was permanently placed at the grave site. Every year, on Independence Day, the flag is replaced in a joint French-American ceremony. The flag remained even during the German occupation of Paris during World War II.
- In 1943, on visiting Corsica, General George S. Patton commented on how the Free French forces had liberated the birthplace of Napoleon, and promised that the Americans would liberate the birthplace of Lafayette.
- In 1958, the Order of Lafayette was established by U.S. Representative Hamilton Fish III, a World War I veteran, to promote Franco-American friendship and to honor Americans who fought in France.
- The frigate Hermione, in which Lafayette returned to America, has been reconstructed in the port of Rochefort, Charente-Maritime, France.
- In 2002, although he became a naturalized American citizen during his lifetime, Lafayette was granted honorary United States citizenship by the United States Congress.
- President's Square, behind the White House, was first known as Lafayette Square by the 1830s, but by the early 20th Century the name was official, particularly after a monument dedicated to Lafayette was dedicated there in 1891.

== Military and maritime ==
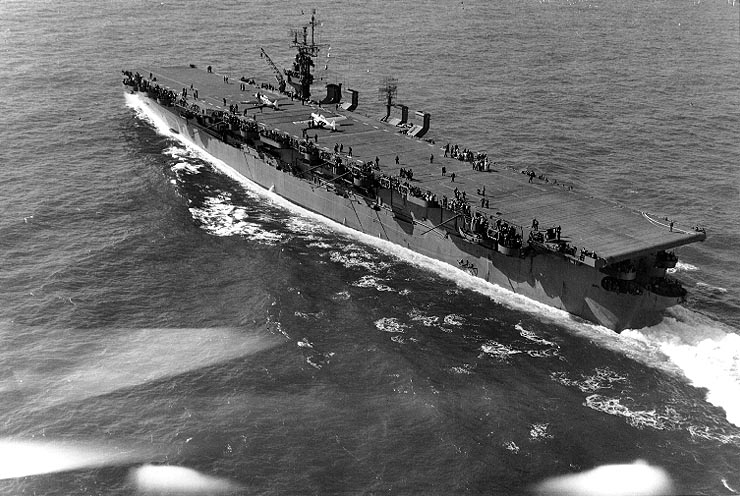
The aircraft carrier USS Langley was renamed La Fayette by France

Several warships were named after Lafayette:

- The French Navy acquired USS Langley in 1951 and renamed it La Fayette.
- The French frigate La Fayette is a modern "stealth frigate" launched in 1992 and in use by the French Navy since 1996. It is the namesake of the La Fayette class of frigates.
- The French ocean-liner SS Normandie was to be the troopship USS Lafayette after being acquired by the US Government, but was destroyed by a fire before conversion to the new role was completed. The name was later given to the USS Lafayette, the lead ship of the Lafayette Class of ballistic missile submarines.
- USS Lafayette, a Constellation-class frigate ordered in 2023, was set to be the third ship of the US Navy to bear the name Lafayette, but was cancelled with the rest of the class in 2025.
- The Lafayette Escadrille was an escadrille of the French Air Service during World War I composed largely of American volunteer pilots.

== Places ==
=== Counties ===
- Fayette County, Alabama
- Fayette County, Georgia
- Fayette County, Kentucky
- Fayette County, Tennessee
- Fayette County, Pennsylvania
- Fayette County, West Virginia
- Lafayette County, Arkansas
- Lafayette County, Mississippi
- Lafayette County, Florida
- Lafayette County, Wisconsin
- Lafayette Parish, Louisiana

=== Cities, towns, and villages ===
- Fayetteville, North Carolina was the first city named after Lafayette, and is the only one he actually visited, arriving in Fayetteville by horse-drawn carriage in 1825 during Lafayette's visit to the United States from July 1824 to September 1825. Has the largest city population.
- Fayetteville, Georgia, seat of Fayette County
- Lagrange, Georgia, named for Lafayette's estate in France
- Fayetteville, New York
- Lafayette, Alabama
- Lafayette, Minnesota
- Fayetteville, Tennessee is named indirectly; the city is named after Fayetteville, North Carolina.
- Fayetteville, Arkansas is named indirectly; the city is named after Fayetteville, TN, which in turn is named after Fayetteville, NC. Has the largest metropolitan population.
- Lafayette, California
- LaFayette, Georgia
- Lafayette, Oregon
- Lafayette, Indiana, seat of Tippecanoe County and the home of Purdue University, named after Lafayette during his tour of America.
- Lafayette, Louisiana
- LaFayette, New York
- LaGrange, New York

=== Squares ===
- Lafayette Square in Buffalo, New York, where he spoke during his nationwide tour in 1825.
- Lafayette Square in Saint Louis, Missouri, created in 1833 as one of the city's first public parks and named in his honor in 1854.
- Lafayette Square, Washington, D.C.
- Lafayette Square, New Orleans, Louisiana
- Lafayette Square in LaGrange, Georgia

=== Streets ===
- Rue La Fayette in Paris, one of the longest roads in the city, which crosses the 9th and 10th arrondissements of the city from southwest to northeast.
- Lafayette Street in New Haven, Connecticut
- Lafayette Street in Williston Park, New York
- New York City
  - Lafayette Avenue in Brooklyn
  - Lafayette Avenue in The Bronx
  - Lafayette Street in Manhattan
  - Lafayette Street in Queens
  - Lafayette Street in Staten Island
- Lafayette Road in New Hampshire, which extends from the Massachusetts border in Seabrook to Portsmouth
- Avenue de Lafayette in Boston, Massachusetts, located in the Downtown Crossing area.
- Lafayette Avenue in Baltimore, Maryland
- Lafayette Boulevard in Bridgeport, Connecticut
- Lafayette Road in Harrington Park, New Jersey
- Lafayette Road in Indianapolis, Indiana
- Lafayette Street in Cape May, New Jersey
- Lafayette Street in Waltham, Massachusetts, located near a critical area during the Revolution.
- Ulice Lafayettova in Olomouc, Czech Republic, is near the site of Lafayette's imprisonment.
- Lafayette Street in Metamora, Illinois
- Lafayette Drive and Lafayette Road in Phoenixville, Pennsylvania, both off of Valley Forge Road located near Valley Forge.
- Lafayette Boulevard in Fredericksburg, Virginia, located near the boyhood home of George Washington at Ferry Farm.
- Lafayette Street in Marianna, Florida.
- Lafayette Street in Williamsburg, Virginia.

=== Schools ===
- Lafayette High School (Alabama), in Lafayette, Alabama
- Lafayette High School (Georgia), in Lafayette, Georgia
- Lafayette High School (Florida), in Mayo, Florida
- Lafayette High School (Lexington, Kentucky), in Lexington, Kentucky
- Lafayette High School (Louisiana), in Lafayette, Louisiana
- Lafayette High School (St. Joseph, Missouri), in St. Joseph, Missouri
- Lafayette High School (Wildwood, Missouri), in Wildwood, Missouri
- Lafayette High School (New York City), in Brooklyn, New York
- Lafayette High School (Buffalo, New York), in Buffalo, New York
- Lafayette High School (Virginia), near Williamsburg, Virginia
- LaFayette Jr./Sr. High School (LaFayette, New York), in LaFayette, New York

=== Other places ===
- Mount Lafayette in the White Mountains of New Hampshire.
- Lafayetteville in Milan, New York
- Lafayette Park, a park and neighborhood in Fall River, Massachusetts
- Lafayette Park, a park in Watkins Glen, New York
- LaGrange, Georgia, named for the Lafayettes' estate in France
- Lafayette Park in San Francisco, California

== Lafayette in sculpture ==
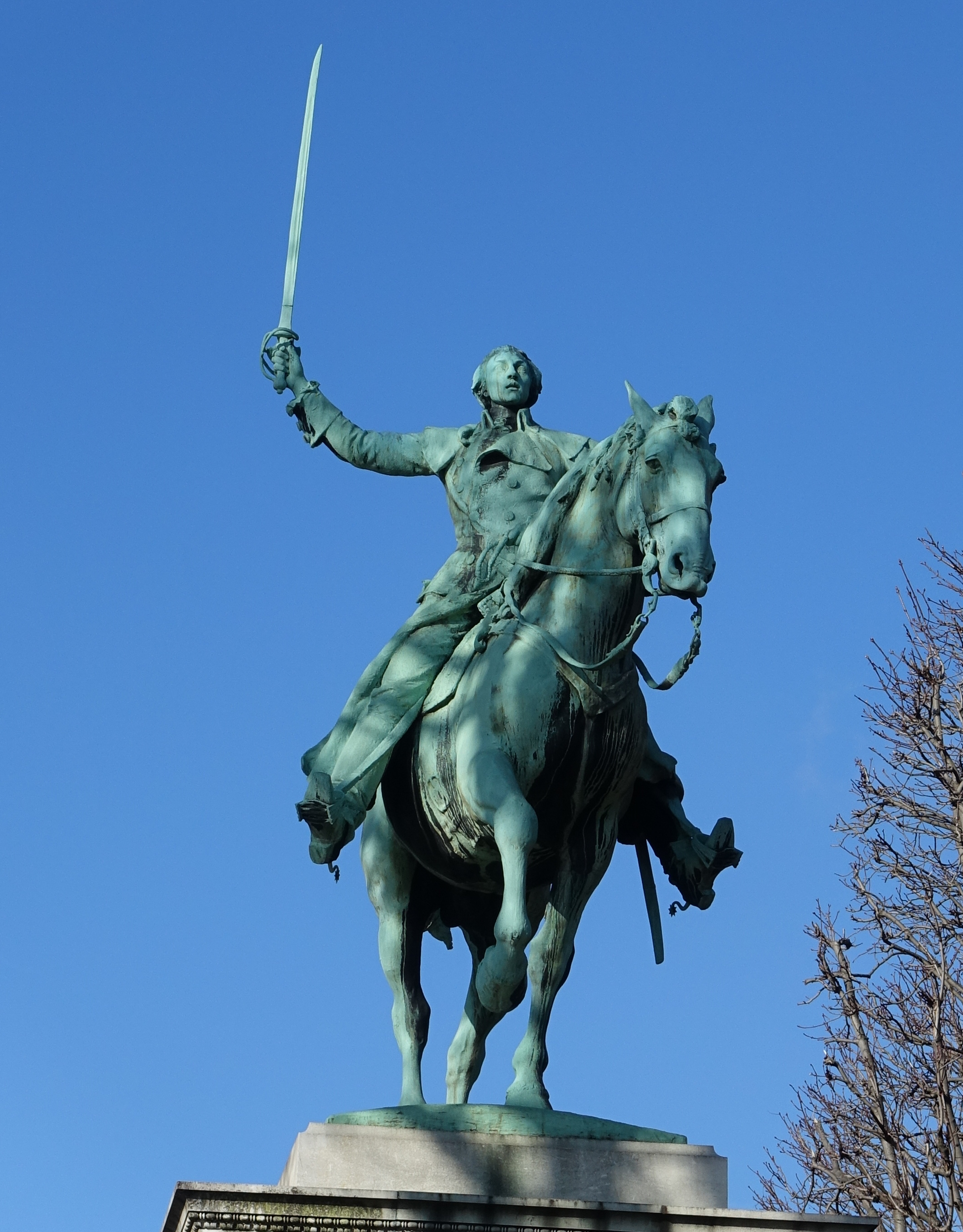
Monument to Lafayette in Paris

- Bust of Lafayette by Houdon, 1786, marble, in the rotunda of the Virginia State Capitol.
- Bust of Lafayette in National Guard uniform by Houdon, 1790, marble, now at Gilcrease Museum, Tulsa, Oklahoma.
- Statue by Bartholdi in Union Square Park, Manhattan, New York, 1876
- Pediment on the Tippecanoe County Courthouse, Lafayette, Indiana, 1882
- Lafayette on the Green, University of Vermont, 1883
- LaFayette Fountain by Lorado Taft in Lafayette, Indiana, 1887
- Statue in Lafayette Square, Washington, D.C., 1891.
- Statue of Lafayette and Washington by Bartholdi, Place des États-Unis (United States Plaza), Paris, France, 1895
- Equestrian statue by Paul Wayland Bartlett, 1908, Cours-la-Reine, Paris. An early version appears on the Lafayette dollar.
- Lafayette Memorial by Daniel Chester French, 1917, Prospect Park, Brooklyn.
- Equestrian statue by Paul Wayland Bartlett, Metz, France 1919, destroyed by German occupation forces and replaced by another statue by M . Goutin in 2004
- Statue of the Marquis de Lafayette on Lafayette College campus, Easton, Pennsylvania, by Daniel Chester French in 1921
- Equestrian statue in front of the Washington Monument in Baltimore, Maryland, 1924
- Statue on Washington Street in Hartford, Connecticut, by Paul Wayland Bartlett. The original of this statue stands in the Louvre, a gift to France from the school children of the United States. 1957.
- Built in 1975, a statue of Lafayette stands atop a fountain in the courthouse square in LaGrange, Georgia.
- Statue of Lafayette on Union Avenue & Warren Street in Havre de Grace, Maryland, 1976
- Statue outside of the Gen. Horatio Gates House and Golden Plough Tavern, York, Pennsylvania, 2007
- Statue of Lafayette, Admiral de Grasse, and General Washington on the Riverwalk Landing in Yorktown, VA, added in 2017.
- Statue of the Marquis de Lafayette (Los Angeles)

== Lafayette in literature ==
- Lydia Sigourney's tribute in poetry, "To General Lafayette", was published in her 1827 collection of poems.

== Gallery ==
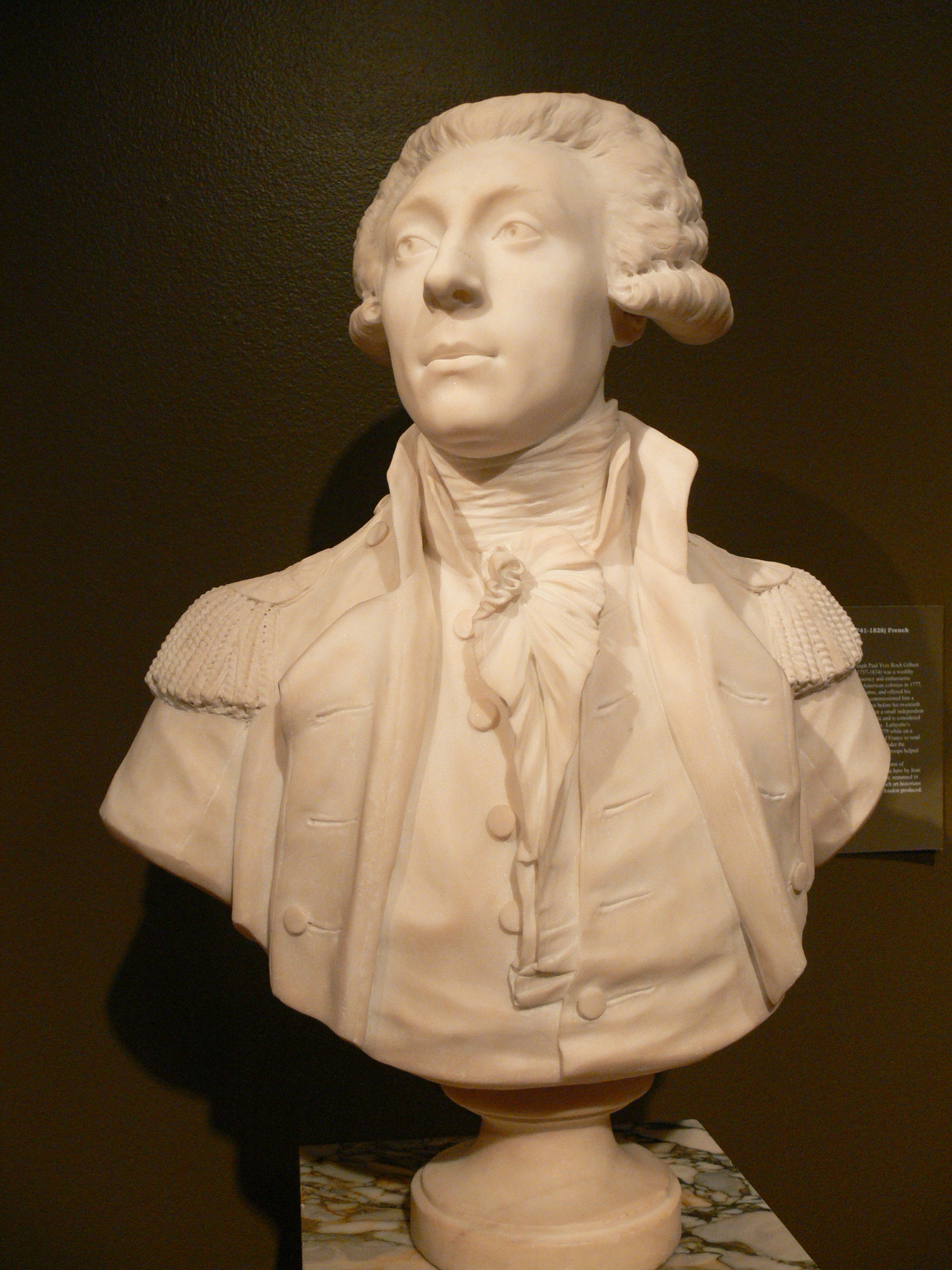
Bust by Houdon (1789)

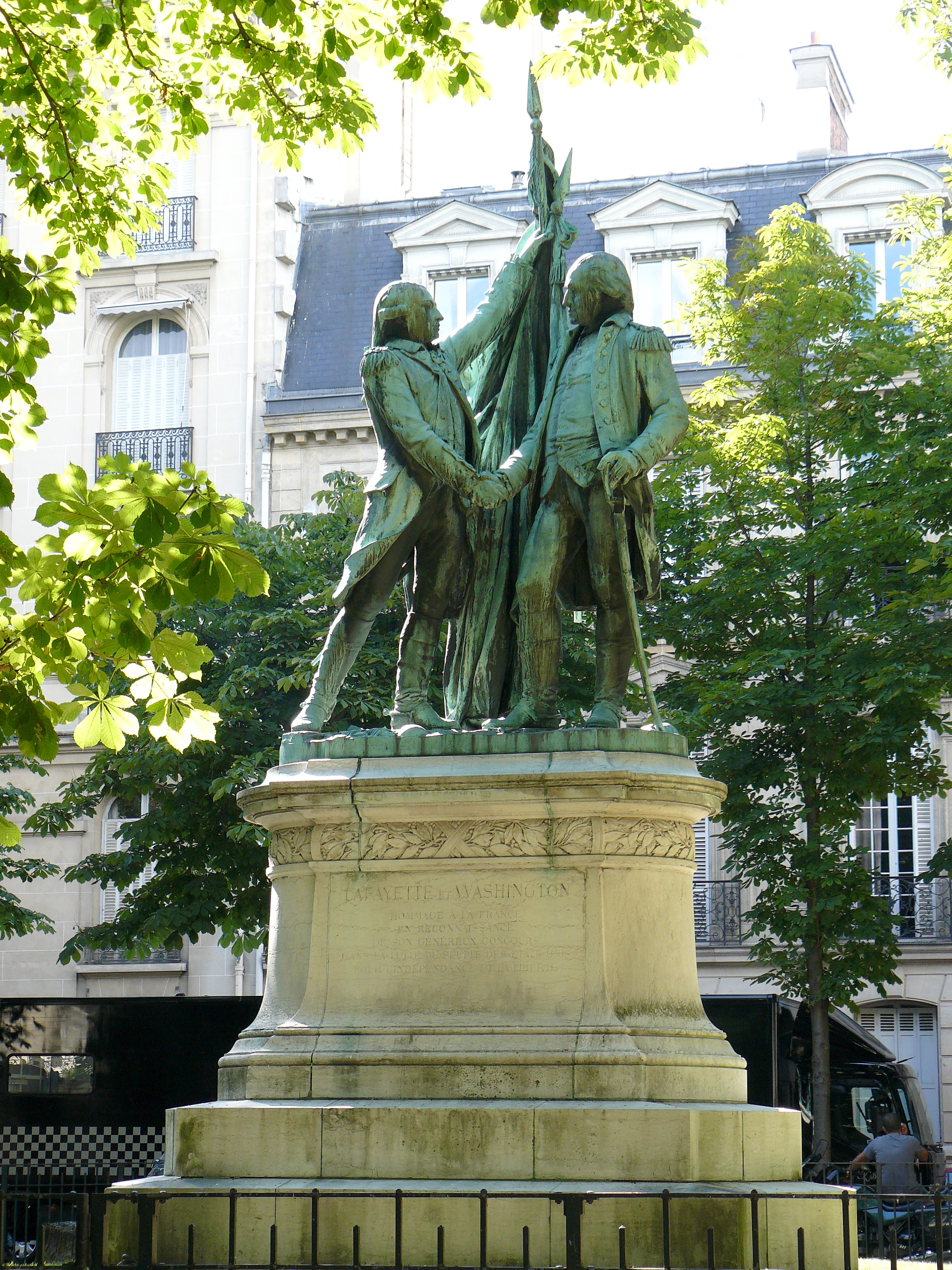
Place des États-Unis, Paris, France (1866)

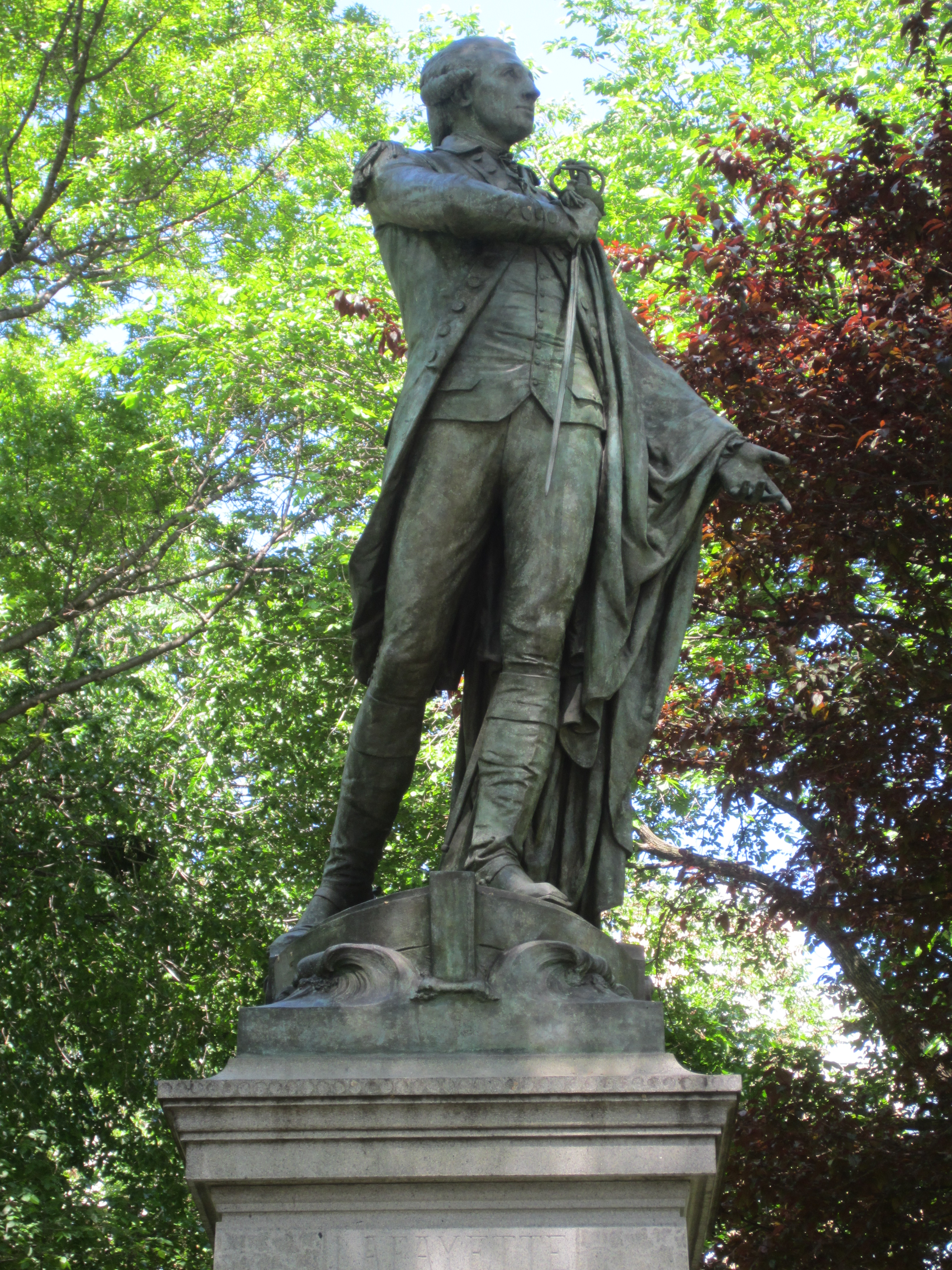
Statue by Bartholdi, Union Square Park, Manhattan, New York, (1876)

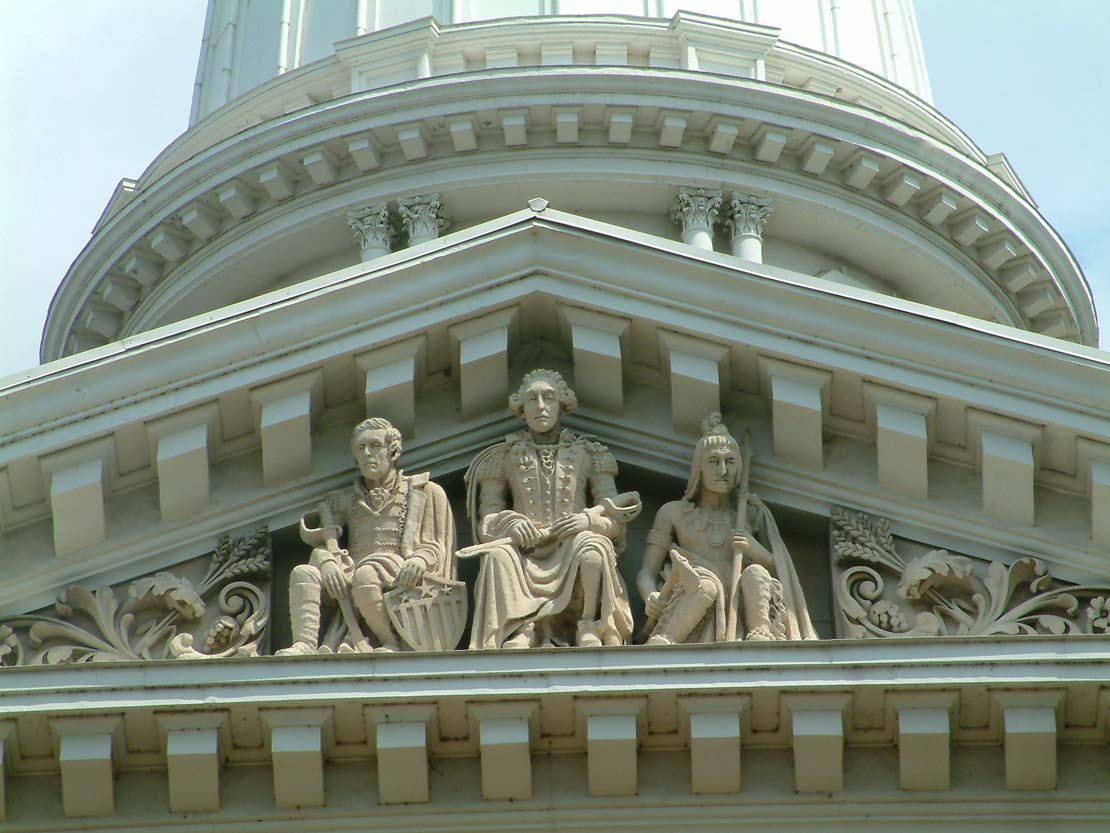
Pediment on the Tippecanoe County Courthouse, Lafayette, Indiana (1882)

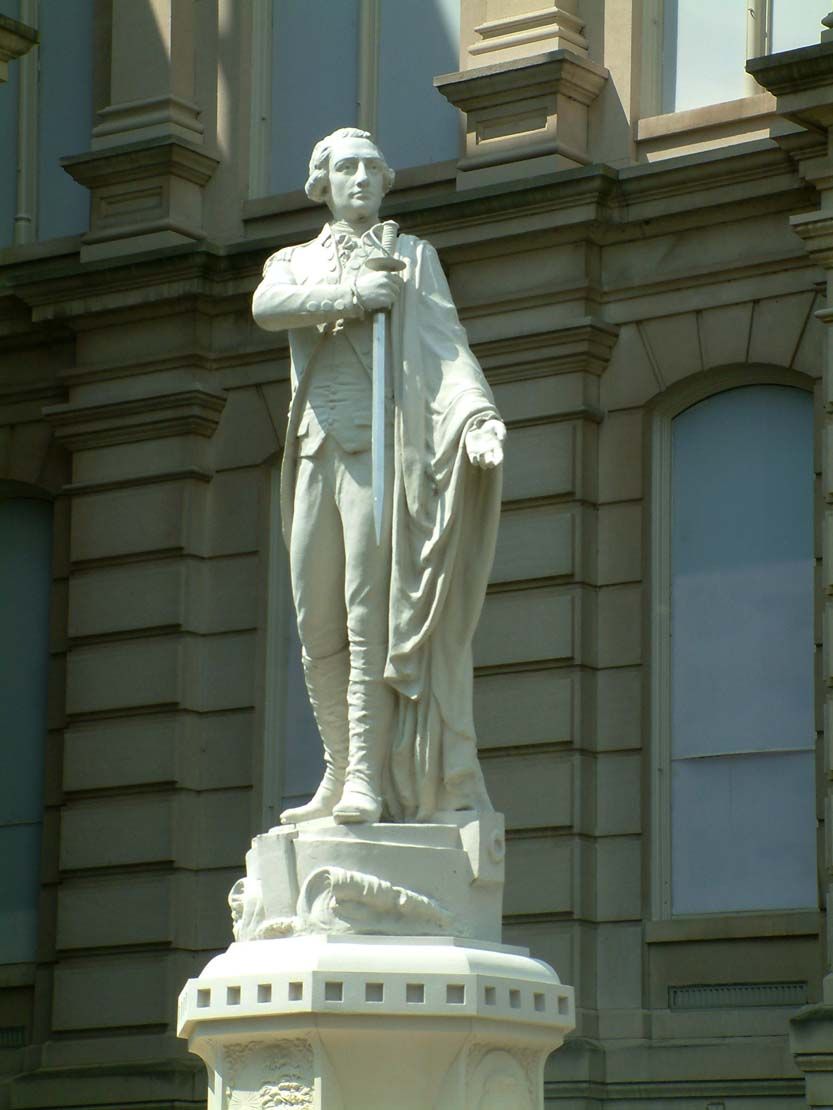
LaFayette Fountain; Lafayette, Indiana (1887)

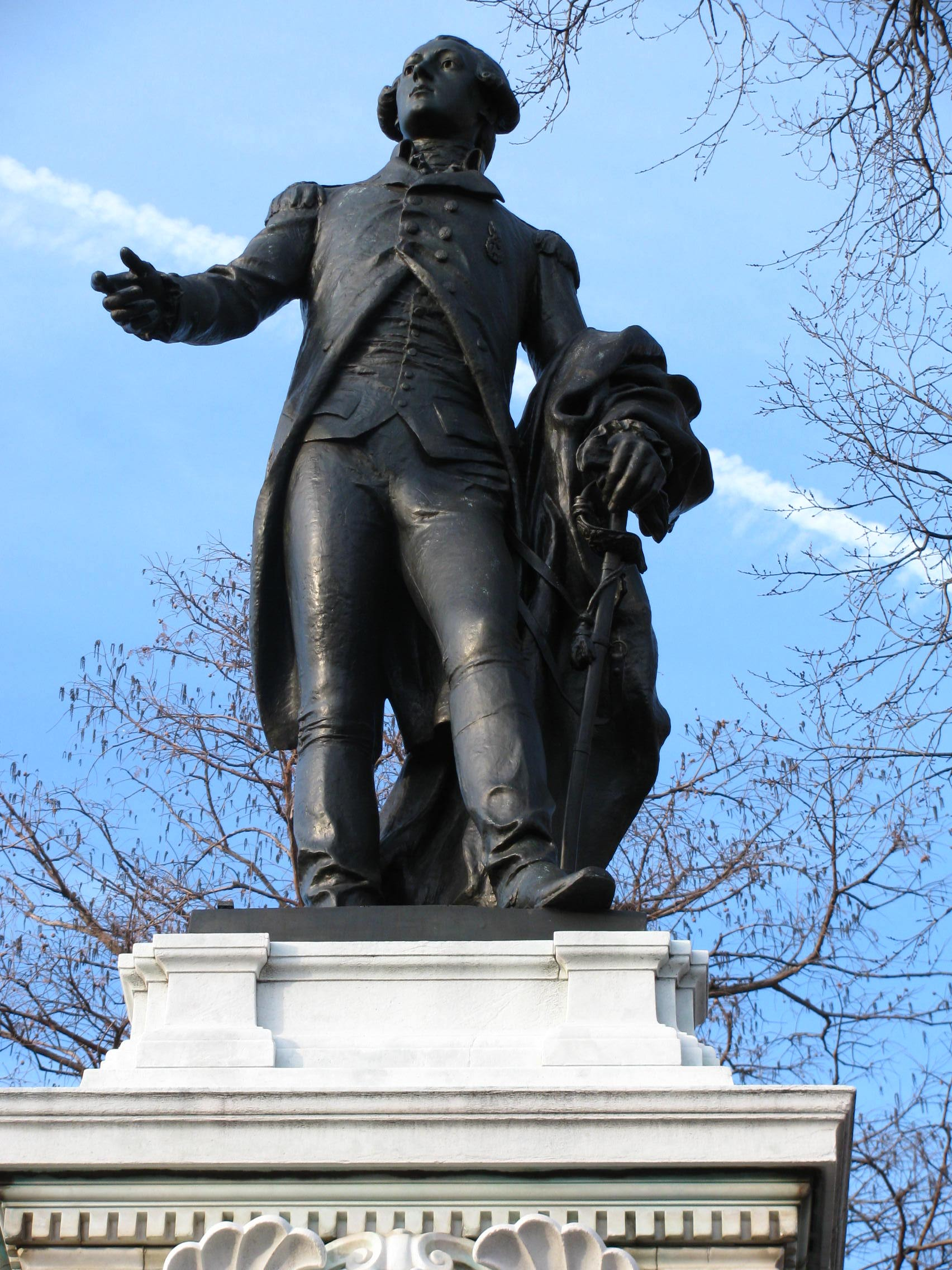
Statue of the Marquis de Lafayette, Lafayette Square, Washington, D.C. (1891)

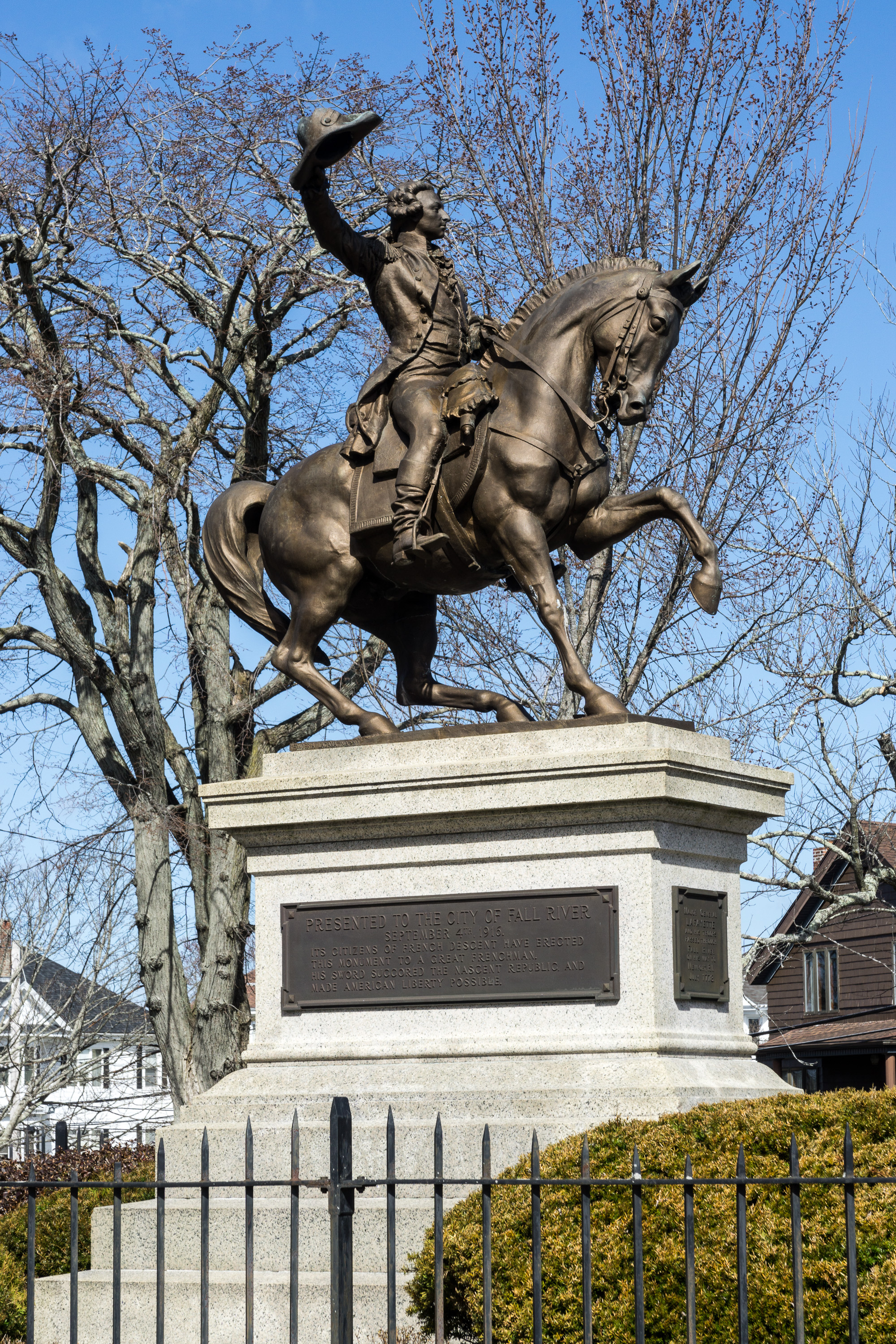
Statue in Lafayette Park, Fall River, Massachusetts (Ettore and Arnaldo Zucchi, 1916)

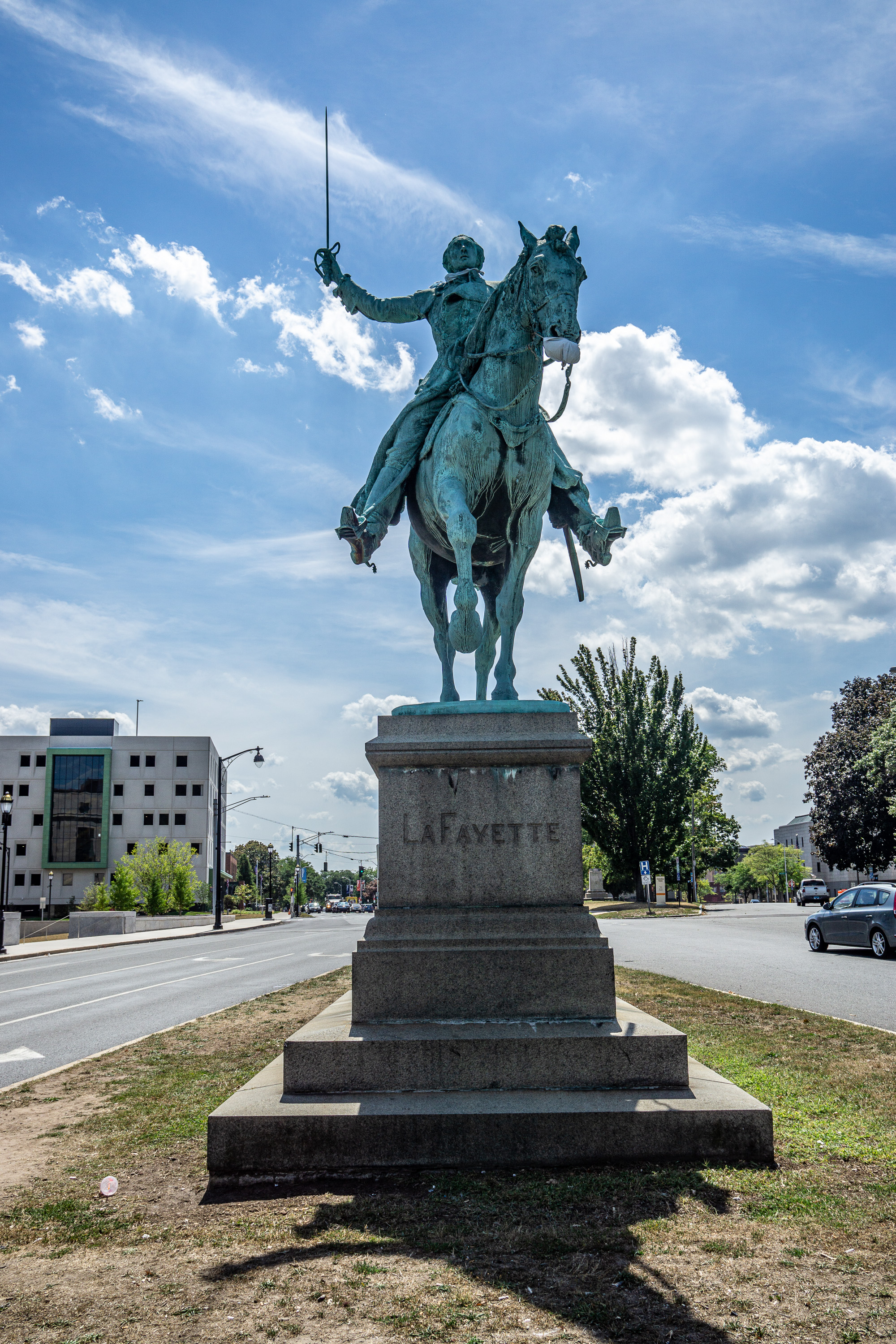
Statue by Paul Wayland Bartlett in Hartford, Connecticut (1957)

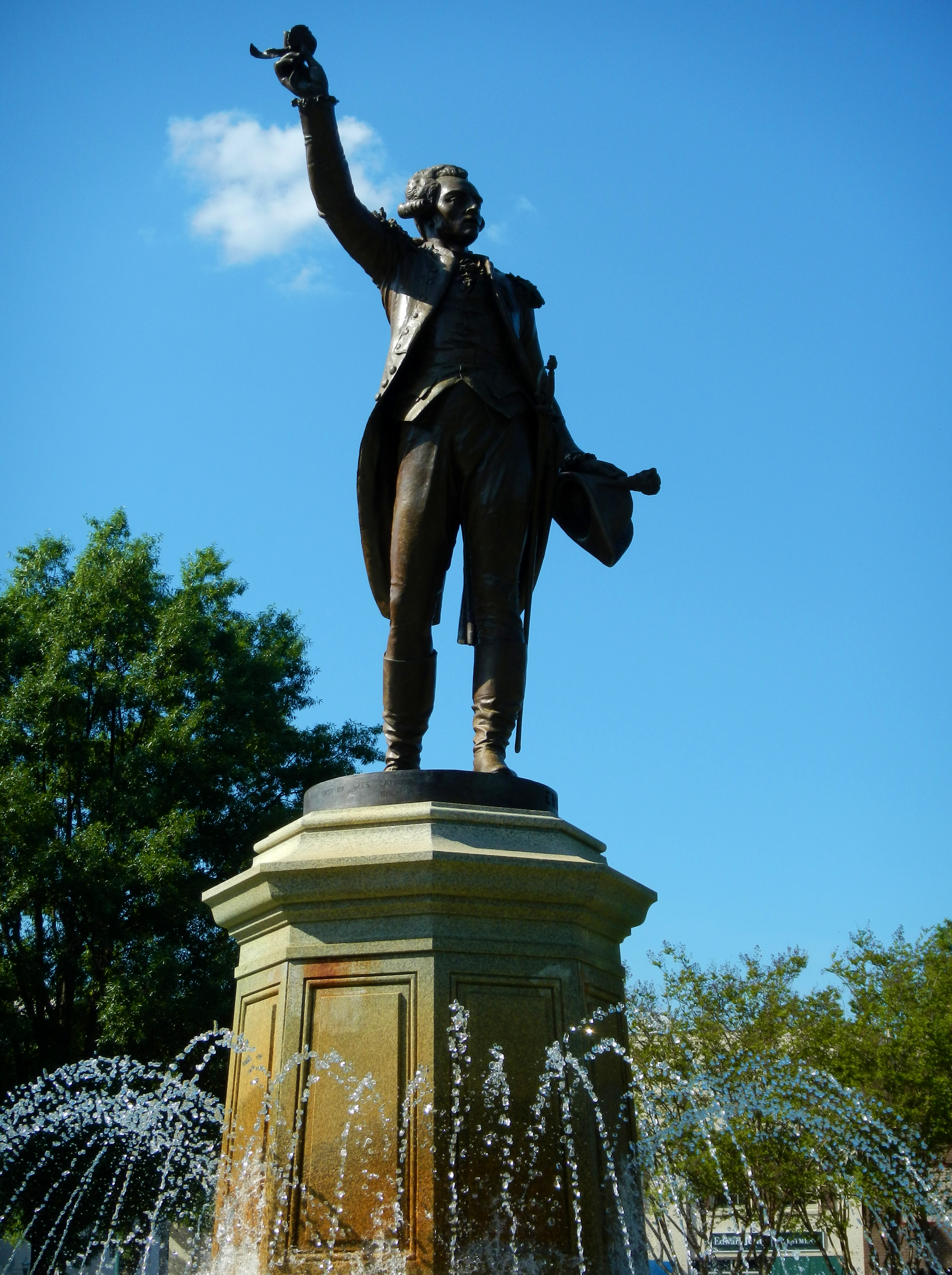
LaFayette Fountain, LaGrange, Georgia (1975)

== Works cited ==
- Kowsky, Francis R., Mark Goldman, Austin Fox, John D. Randall, Jack Quinan, and Teresa Lasher (1982). Buffalo Architecture: A Guide (Third printing ed.). The MIT Press. ISBN 0-262-02172-2.
- Clary, David (2007). Adopted Son: Washington, Lafayette, and the Friendship that Saved the Revolution. Bantam Books. ISBN 978-0-553-80435-5.
- Gaines, James R. (2007). For Liberty and Glory: Washington, La Fayette, and Their Revolutions. W.W. Norton & Co. ISBN 978-0-393-06138-3.
