= James Armistead Lafayette =

African American slave and double agent

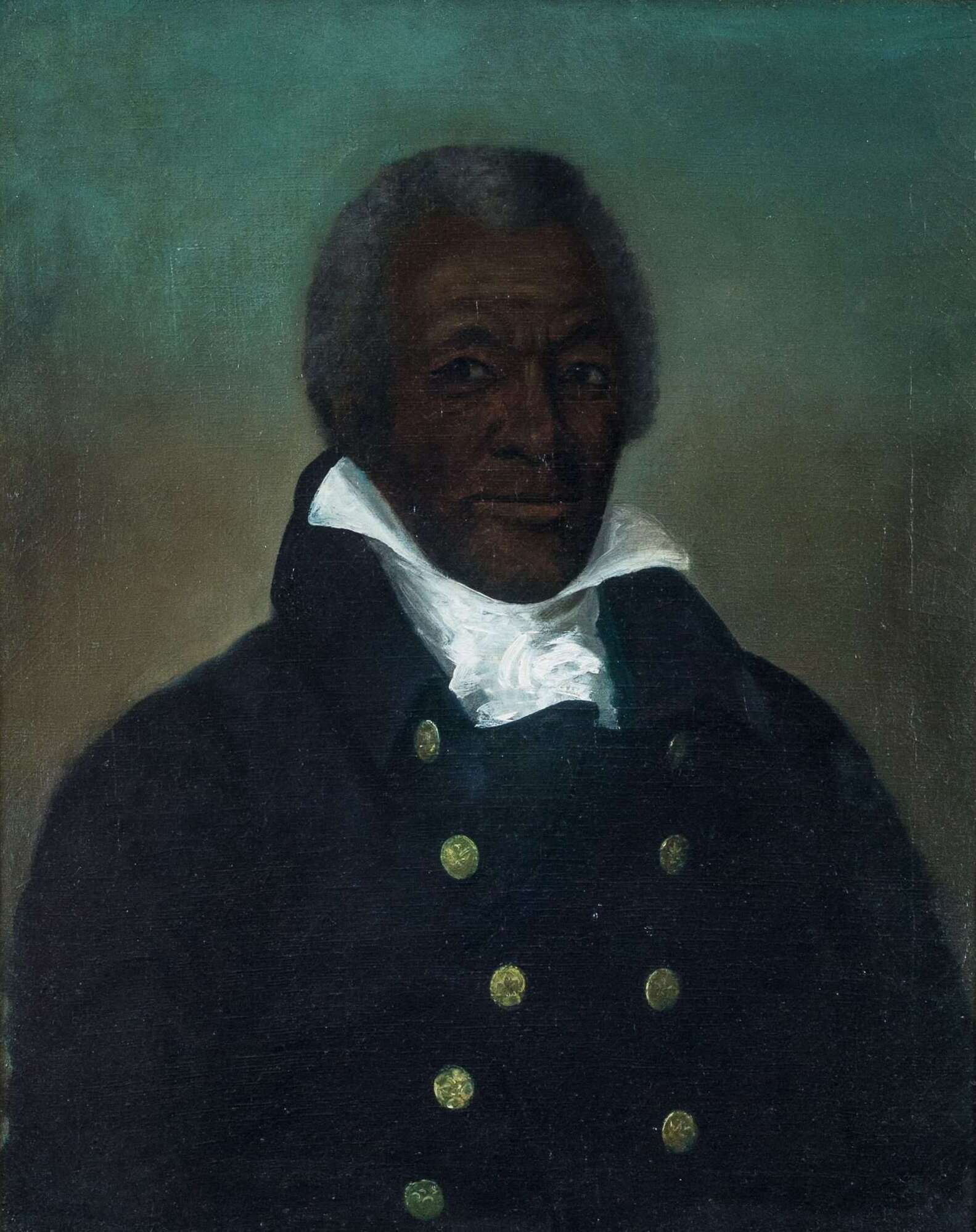
- Portrait attributed to John Blennerhassett Martin, c. 1824
- Born: James Armistead; 1748/1760; New Kent County or Elizabeth City, Virginia
- Died: 1830/1832 (aged 70–84); Baltimore, Maryland or Virginia

James Armistead Lafayette (1748/1760 —1830/1832) was an African American man who worked as a double agent for the Patriots during the American Revolutionary War. During the Yorktown campaign, he reported on the activities of Benedict Arnold after Arnold had defected to the British and Lord Cornwallis' activities during the run-up to the siege of Yorktown. Lafayette fed the British false information while disclosing accurate and detailed information to the Patriots.

== Early life ==
James Armistead Lafayette was born to an enslaved mother either in North Carolina or Virginia. He became the property of Colonel John Armistead of New Kent County, Virginia. Well before the Colonel's death in 1779 he became the first slave owned by and personal manservant of Armistead's son William. Most sources believe that he was born in 1748, though others put his birth around 1760. James's enslaver taught him to read and write.

== American Revolution ==
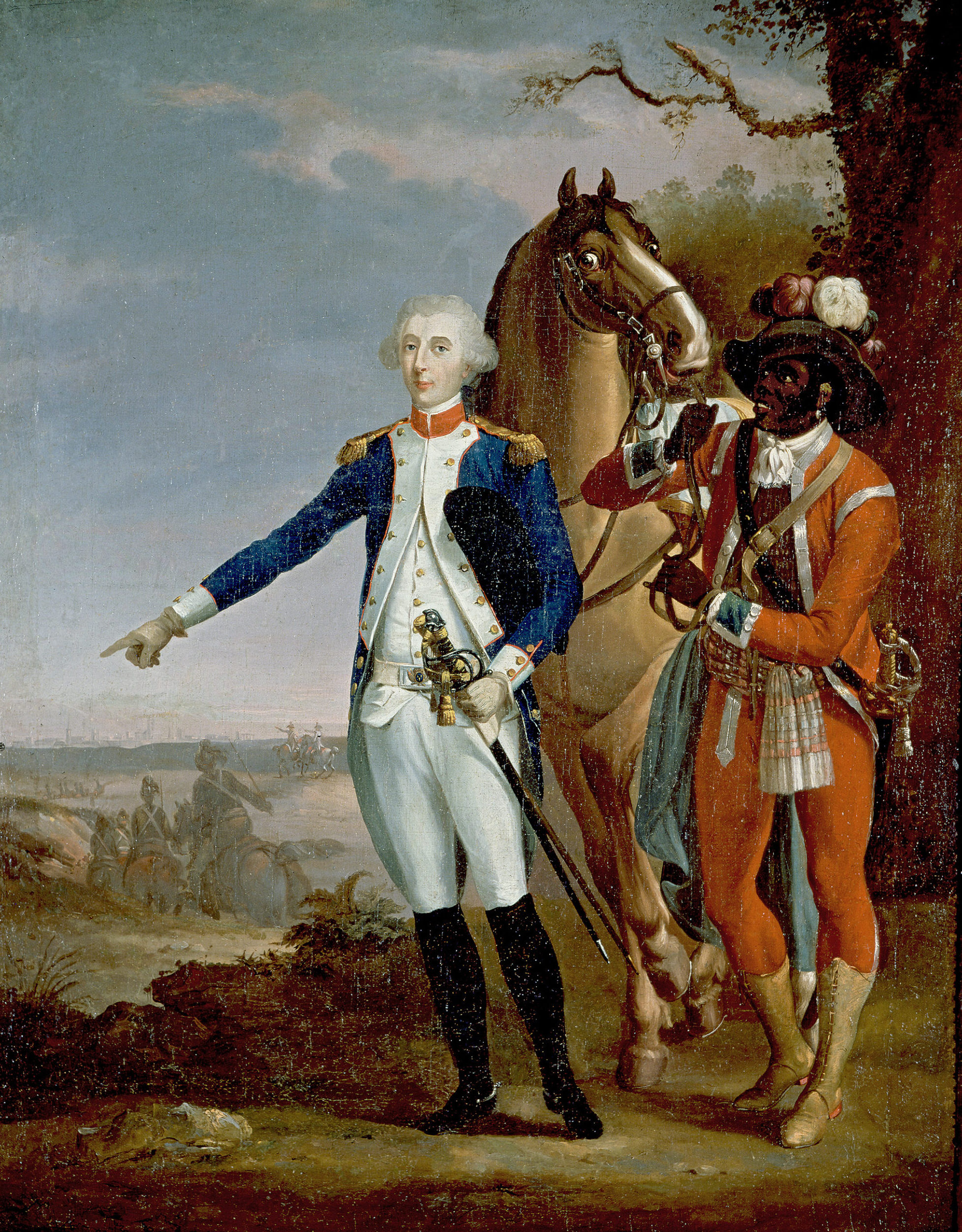
Lafayette at Yorktown (Jean-Baptiste Le Paon, c. 1783–1785). The Black groom to Lafayette's left has been identified by several historians as James.

His enslaver William Armistead was an ardent Patriot, and served as commissary for Virginian troops during the American Revolutionary War. After his father died in 1779, William inherited stores and land, as well as James (who never used "Armistead" as his surname during his lifetime). When the Revolutionary War began in 1775, Virginia's royal governor Lord Dunmore promised freedom to Patriot-owned slaves who joined his forces. Instead, James volunteered for the Continental Army under General Marquis de Lafayette. He worked for Lafayette as a courier, laborer, and spy. Posing as a runaway slave, James joined former Continental Army officer Benedict Arnold's camp in Portsmouth, Virginia ostensibly as a spy for the British. This role allowed Armistead to gain Arnold's confidence, in part by guiding British troops through local roads. "The ex-slave, who later renamed himself James Armistead Lafayette in the general's honor, served as a double agent against the British under the avowedly anti-slavery Lafayette."

After Arnold departed north in the spring of 1781, James remained in Virginia and continued his work at the camps of Lord Cornwallis. Now employed by the British as a courier, James traveled between their camps and often overheard officers speak openly about their strategies. He prepared written reports, and delivered them to other American spies. In this way, he relayed much information about the British plans for troop deployment and their arms. His espionage was instrumental in helping American and French forces force the surrender of Cornwallis' army during the siege of Yorktown.

== Legislative emancipation ==
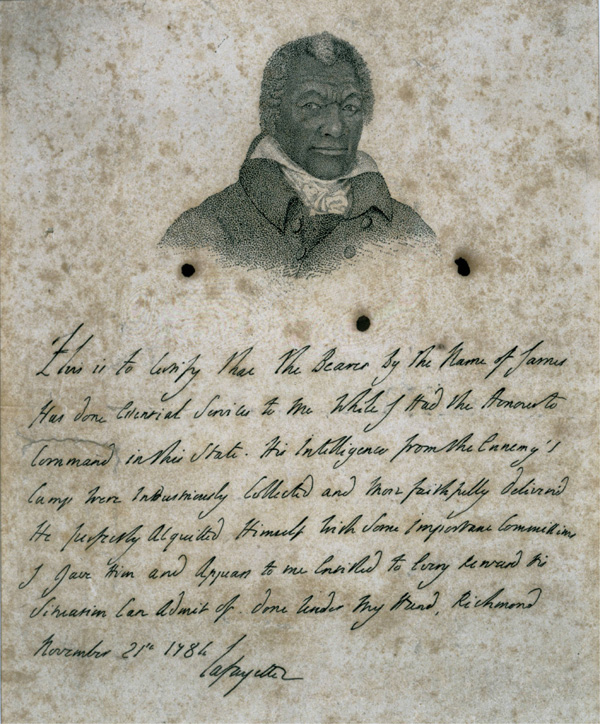
Facsimile of Lafayette's certificate of commendation for James

Although Virginia enacted a manumission act in 1782 allowing for the freedom of any slave who had fought in the Revolutionary War, James Armistead remained the property of William Armistead. This was because the next year (1783) another law specifically freed only slaves who had been issued firearms (i.e. whose owners had used them as substitutes for army service). James had served as a spy, not a soldier, and did not carry a gun. Thus his first petition for emancipation was not passed even by a legislative committee before the session ended. However, James persisted and succeeded with the support of William Armistead – again in 1786 a member of the House of Delegates – and Lafayette's personal 1784 testimonial as to James's service. On January 9, 1787, Virginia's governor signed James's petition, which both houses of the assembly had passed. Virginia later compensated Armistead for James' manumission. Upon receiving his freedom, James added "Lafayette" (or "Fayette") as his surname to honor the French general.

== Later life ==
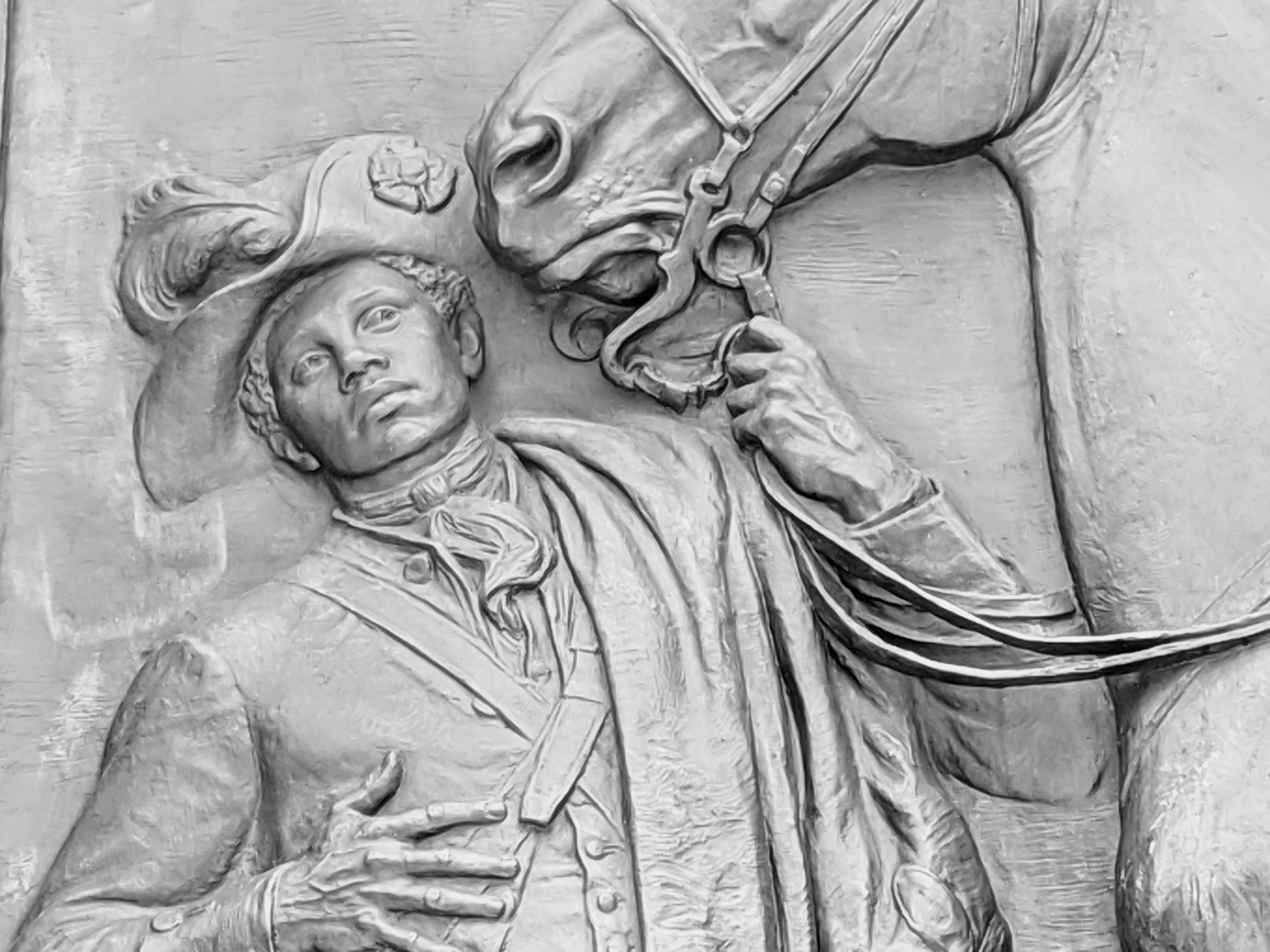
Possible depiction of James on the Lafayette Memorial

James Lafayette acquired two parcels totaling about forty acres in New Kent County in 1816 and became a relatively wealthy farmer in the area with his (second) wife and several children (including a son). He also became a slaveowner. In 1818, Lafayette applied to Virginia's legislature for a pension based on his Revolutionary War service. He eventually received $60 (equivalent to $1,262 in 2025) for present relief and a $40 annual pension ($841).

In 1824, the Marquis de Lafayette returned to the United States at the invitation of President James Monroe. He made a tour of all 24 states, during which huge crowds gathered to see him and he was feted as a hero. Lafayette visited Yorktown, as well as George Washington's grave at Mount Vernon and also gave a speech to the Virginia General Assembly in Richmond. While in Richmond, he abruptly ordered his carriage stopped when he saw James in the crowd, and rushed to embrace him.

== Death and legacy ==
Sources differ as to whether James A. Lafayette died in Baltimore or New Kent County in 1830 (the year he picked up his last pension payment), or in Virginia in 1832.

During his lifetime, James's heroism was mentioned in a two-volume book of historical fiction by James E. Heath, Edge Hill: or the Family of the Fitz Royals (1828). The French artist Jean-Baptiste Le Paon included a black servant in French livery in a portrait he painted of the Marquis de LaFayette in 1785, which some think was intended to represent this man. John Blennerhassett Martin painted his portrait about the time of Heath's book, and distributed copies with the Marquis de LaFayette's testimony concerning his service. Some believe a figure of James Lafayette may be on the Lafayette memorial dedicated in Prospect Park, in Brooklyn, New York in 1917 and in turn the painting Lafayette at Yorktown by Jean-Baptiste Le Paon upon which the monument's sculptural relief is based. In 1997, Virginia erected a highway marker on the grounds of the historic New Kent County courthouse to recognize his service.

== See also ==
- Intelligence in the American Revolutionary War
- Benjamin Tallmadge
- Liberty's Kids, episode 35
