= John Blennerhassett Martin =

American painter

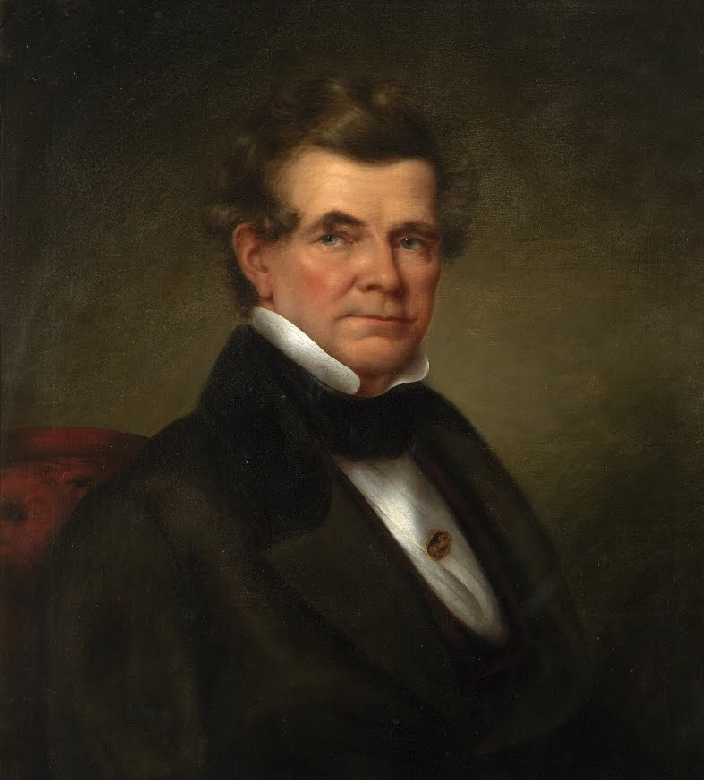
Portrait of Virginia governor John M. Patton, by Martin

John Blennerhassett Martin (September 5, 1797 – October 27, 1857), was an American painter, engraver and lithographer.

== Biography ==
Martin was born in Bandon, County Cork Ireland, but emigrated at age 18 to the United States in 1815. He initially lived and studied engraving in New York City, then in 1816 moved to Richmond, Virginia where he lived and worked. Martin painted a series of portraits of Chief Justice John Marshall, one of which hung in the US Supreme Court Building for many years. Martin has been identified as the painter of a portrait of James Armistead Lafayette in c. 1824. He died in Richmond in 1857.
