= William Armistead (1754–1793) =

American commissary and politician (died 1793)

Member of the Virginia House of Delegates from New Kent County
- In office May 3, 1784 – October 16, 1786 Serving with John Watkins, William Hartwell Macon
- Preceded by: William Dandridge
- Succeeded by: William Dandridge

Personal details
- Born: January 5, 1754 New Kent County, Virginia
- Died: 1793 (aged 38–39) New Kent County, Virginia
- Relations: Robert Burbridge Armistead (half-brother)
- Parent(s): Col. John Armistead, Agnes Knowles
- Occupation: planter, politician

William Armistead (January 5, 1754 – 1793) was a Virginia planter, merchant and politician in New Kent County, Virginia, which he twice represented in the House of Delegates.

== Early and family life ==
The son of the former Agnes Knowles and her husband, Col. John Armistead, was born in New Kent County. He was likely named to honor his grandfather, Capt. (then Major) William Armistead, who had a brother Gill Armistead and both served on the vestry of Blisland Parish (although Col. John Armistead moved to St. Peter's Parish and served on its vestry, in addition to his military duties and occupation as a planter). His mother died when William was a boy, and his father remarried to Mary Burbridge, who gave birth to Robert Burbridge Armistead, his half-brother (Robert B. Armistead would also serve in the Virginia House of Delegates during the 1796 term and named a son "William", who would marry a granddaughter of once powerful speaker John Robinson).

== Career ==
William Armistead was trained to operate his family's estates using enslaved labor. As was the custom at the time, his father informally gave him an enslaved boy as a child, who was raised with him and would become his personal manservant. In this case, the man sometimes known as James Armistead Lafayette (but who never in his lifetime took "Armistead" as his middle or surname) became more famous than his master, for as a spy and double-agent, he provided crucial intelligence which led to the British defeat during the Siege of Yorktown.

During the Revolutionary War, Armistead served for more than three years as paymaster and commissary for Virginia's troops. For provisioning Virginia's troops, he had been promised 35,000 lbs of tobacco. However, he was never paid in his lifetime, because a 1783 fire at the New Kent courthouse had destroyed his books and records for 1780 and 1781. Thus, he was unable to submit the necessary accounting. The fire which burned down both the clerk's office and nearby jail had been part of an escape attempt of John Price Posey, who had been steward of the Pamunkey River plantation for the underage George Washington Parke Custis. Previously convicted of stealing from the estate, as suggested by former General George Washington as Custis's guardian, Posey had resisted arrested by sheriff Robert B. Armistead (this man's step-brother) but ultimately jailed in June 1783 for stealing from the estate. Rearrested and convicted on the testimony of his accomplice, Posey appealed his conviction, but it was affirmed by nine of ten judges of the Court of Appeals, and Presiding Judge Peter Lyons asked Posey to show cause why he should not receive a death sentence. Despite asking for mercy, Posey was handed in Richmond on January 25, 1788. Despite the fire losses, New Kent County voters elected Armistead as one of their representatives in the House of Delegates in 1784, and re-elected him once. During the second term, he secured passage of legislative emancipation for his bodyservant James, and received compensation. During the 1787 Virginia tax census, William Armistead continued to own 12 enslaved adults and nine younger slaves, as well as three horses and 26 cattle, although only his half-brother Robert lived in the county. Armistead suffered from ill health and financial distress during his final years.

== Death and legacy ==
His step-brother became one of New Kent County's (part-time) delegates in 1796. Their neighbor (and later delegate) John Dandridge submitted a petition to the Virginia General Assembly seeking compensation for his client, which succeeded in 1801 (years after Dandridge's death). Decades later, in 1752, Virginia Governor John Floyd allowed his heirs, Elizabeth Camp and John Allen, payment for his Revolutionary War service as paymaster for the Virginia State Line.
