= Lafayette Memorial =

Memorial in Brooklyn, New York, U.S.

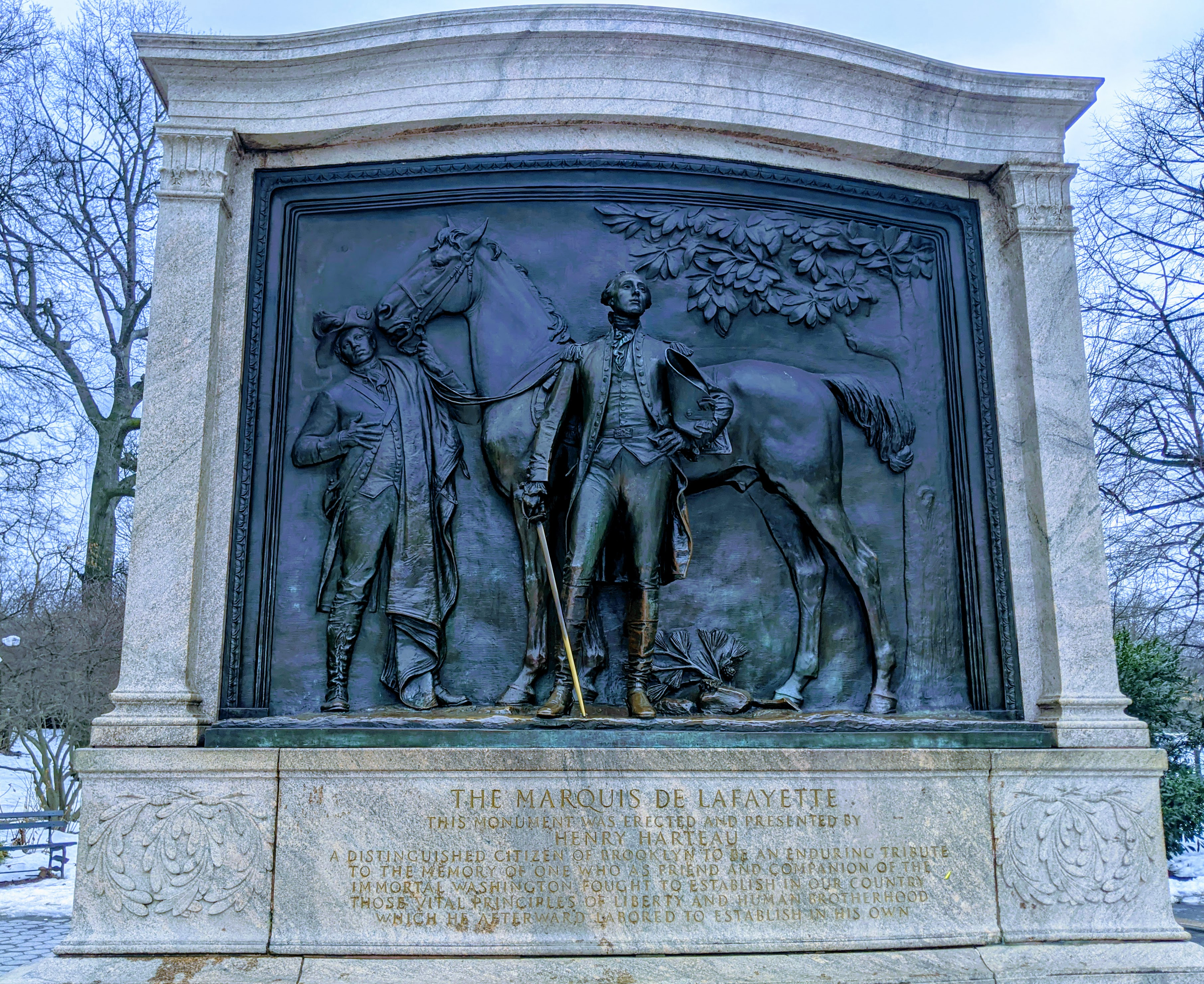
- Lafayette Memorial (2021)
- Interactive map of Lafayette Memorial
- Location: Prospect Park, Brooklyn, New York City, New York, United States
- Coordinates: 40°39′52″N 73°58′35.7″W
- Designer: Daniel Chester French (sculptor); Henry Bacon (architect)
- Fabricator: Gorham foundry Presbrey-Coykendall Company
- Material: Bronze; Granite
- Length: 9 feet (2.7 m)
- Width: 22 feet (6.7 m)
- Height: 19 feet (5.8 m)
- Dedicated date: May 10, 1917
- Dedicated to: Gilbert du Motier, Marquis de Lafayette

The Lafayette Memorial is a public memorial located in Brooklyn's Prospect Park in New York City. The memorial, designed by sculptor Daniel Chester French and architect Henry Bacon, was dedicated in 1917 and consists of a bas-relief of Gilbert du Motier, Marquis de Lafayette alongside a groom (speculated by some historians to be James Armistead Lafayette) and a horse.

== History ==
The memorial has its origins in the will of Henry Harteau, a notable citizen of Brooklyn who died in 1895. Harteau had served in numerous government positions in the city throughout his life, including as a parks commissioner under Brooklyn Mayor Daniel D. Whitney. In his will, he stipulated that, after the death of his wife, $35,000 would be allocated to the city of Brooklyn to fund the erection of a statue in honor of Gilbert du Motier, Marquis de Lafayette in the city's Prospect Park. Despite legal challenges to the will and the consolidation of New York City, when his widow died in 1913, efforts were made to erect a monument for the Marquis de Lafayette. Harteau had requested that the statue be based on the painting Lafayette at Yorktown by Jean-Baptiste Le Paon.

Sculptor Daniel Chester French was selected to design the monument, with Henry Bacon serving as the project's architect. The design of the memorial would consist of a relief, sculpted by French, surrounded by a supporting structure designed by Bacon. An April 1915 issue of The Monumental News stated that French's design for the memorial had been approved by the Municipal Art Commission, while a November 1916 issue of the magazine Stone reported that a model had been prepared to be cast, but that a lack of molding sand had caused the dedication of the monument to be put off until the following year. The article also mentioned that French had worked on the monument for about a year and a half at that time. The bronze relief was cast by the Gorham foundry, while granite for the surrounding structure was provided by the Presbrey-Coykendall Company, which also served as the project's general contractor.

The memorial was dedicated on May 10, 1917. Occurring during World War I, the memorial was unveiled by Marshal of France Joseph Joffre, with former Prime Minister of France René Viviani serving as the orator for the dedication ceremony. They were there as members of the French War Commission. On May 10, 2017, Anne-Claire Legedre, the consul-general of France in New York City, presided over centennial celebrations for the monument.

== Design ==
The memorial consists of a bronze relief fitted into a Stony Creek granite structure that acts as the base and frame for the relief. This frame is of the Italian Renaissance architecture. The relief depicts Lafayette facing forwards, with his left hand on his hip and his right hand holding a slender sword that has its tip touching the ground. A tricorne is held in his left arm, and he is wearing the uniform of a major general. The horse is tended to by an African American groom wearing a military uniform, with a cockade and feather in his hat and something such as a blanket or a cloak draped across one of his shoulders. To the right is a magnolia tree, with a pine branch on the ground.

The relief measures approximately 10 feet (3.0 m) tall and 13 feet (4.0 m) wide, while the overall structure has a height of 19 feet (5.8 m), a width of 22 feet (6.7 m), and a depth of 9 feet (2.7 m). It is located at the Ninth Street entrance to the park.

The memorial bears the following inscriptions:

THE MARQUIS DE LAFAYETTE [---] THIS MONUMENT WAS / ERECTED AND PRESENTED BY HENRY HARTEAU A DISTINGUISHED CITIZEN OF BROOKLYN TO BE AN / ENDURING TRIBUTE TO THE MEMORY OF ONE WHO AS / A FRIEND AND COMPANION OF THE IMMORTAL WASH INGTON FOUGHT TO ESTABLISH IN OUR COUNTRY / THOSE VITAL PRINCIPLES OF LIBERTY AND HUMAN / BROTHERHOOD WHICH HE AFTERWARD LABORED TO ESTABLISH IN HIS OWN

— Front

THIS MEMORIAL WAS UNVEILED AND DEDICATED BY / MARSHALL JOFFRE AND M. VIVANI OF THE FRENCH / WAR COMMISSION, MAY 10, 1917

— Rear

=== Identity of the groom ===
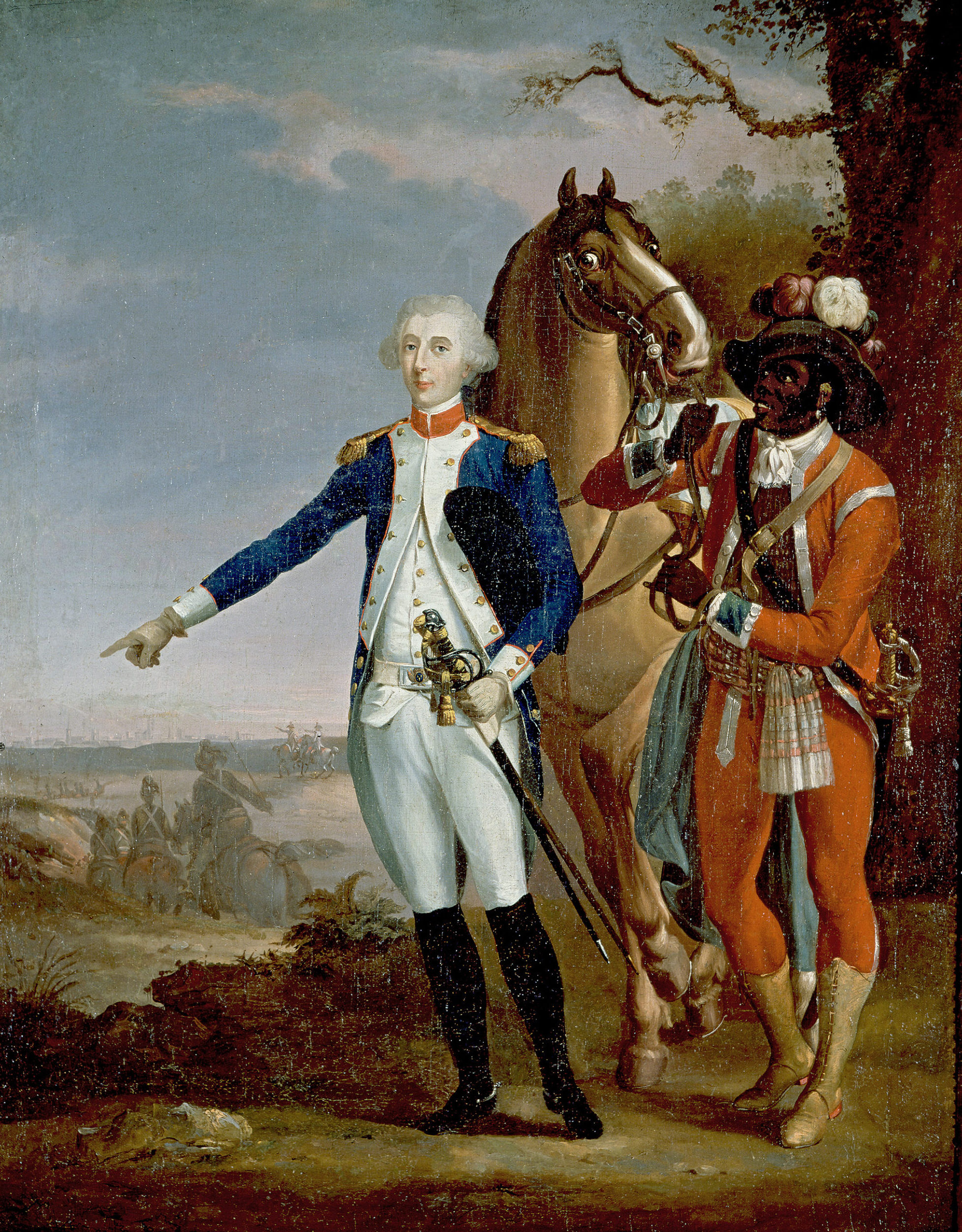
Lafayette at Yorktown (Jean-Baptiste Le Paon, c. 1783–1785)

According to the New York City Department of Parks and Recreation, there is some debate among scholars as to the identity of the figure alongside Lafayette in the painting that the memorial is based upon, with some positing that it is James Armistead Lafayette, an enslaved African American who served under Lafayette during the American Revolutionary War. After the war, Lafayette helped him gain his freedom, leading to Armistead adopting the last name "Lafayette" as a sign of respect. A 2016 article in Intelligencer claims definitively that the painting depicts Armistead, while the parks department notes that no mention of Armistead is made by either Le Paon or French in written descriptions they made of their works and that evidence that the painting or memorial depict Armistead is "inconclusive".

== See also ==
- 1917 in art
- Honors and memorials to the Marquis de Lafayette
- Public sculptures by Daniel Chester French
