= Lafayette at Yorktown =

Painting by Jean-Baptiste Le Paon

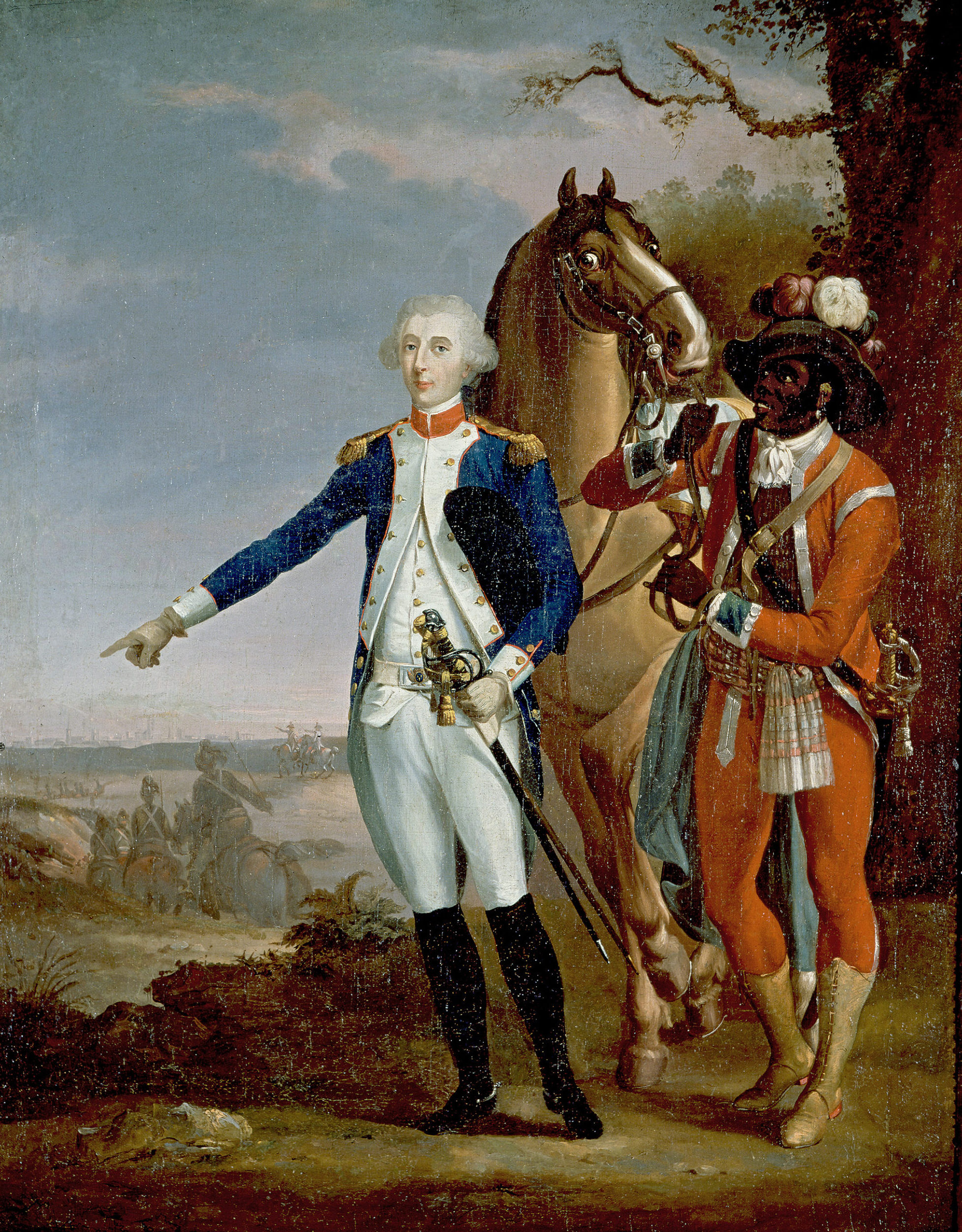
- Artist: Jean-Baptiste Le Paon
- Year: c. 1783–1785
- Medium: Oil-on-canvas
- Location: Lafayette College, Easton, Pennsylvania, U.S.

Lafayette at Yorktown is a c. 1783–1785 painting by the French painter Jean-Baptiste Le Paon. It depicts the Marquis de Lafayette and a Black groom at the 1781 siege of Yorktown, the final major engagement of the American Revolutionary War. The groom has been identified by several historians as James Armistead Lafayette, who assisted the Continental Army as a double agent under the Marquis.

The Lafayette Memorial designed by Daniel Chester French and Henry Bacon at Prospect Park in Brooklyn is based on the painting as was directed by the bequest in the will of the French-born Brooklynite Henry Hatreau, who left the funds for the monument's creation. Le Paon's painting is in the permanent collection of Lafayette College in Easton, Pennsylvania.
