= French aircraft carrier La Fayette =

Independence-class aircraft carrier

La Fayette
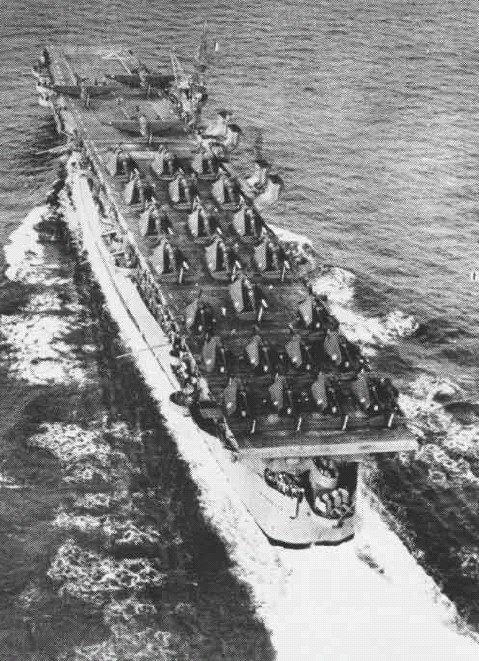
- La Fayette in 1951

History

France
- Name: La Fayette
- Laid down: 11 April 1942
- Launched: 22 May 1943
- Identification: R96
- Fate: Sold for scrapping

General characteristics
- Class & type: Independence-class aircraft carrier
- Displacement: 11,000
- Length: 622.5 ft (189.7 m)
- Beam: 71.5 ft (21.8 m) (waterline); 109 ft 2 in (33.27 m) (overall)
- Draft: 26 ft (7.9 m)
- Speed: 31 knots (57 km/h)
- Complement: 1,569 officers and men
- Armament: 26 × 40 mm guns
- Aircraft carried: 45 aircraft

La Fayette was an 11,000-ton Independence-class aircraft carrier that served the French Navy from 1951 to 1963. She was the first French vessel named after the 18th century general Marquis de Lafayette. She was initially USS Langley (CVL-27) serving the United States Navy from 1943 to 1947 before transferring to the French Navy.

== History ==
Built at Camden, New Jersey, Langley was originally ordered as the light cruiser USS Fargo (CL-85), but by the time her keel was laid in April 1942, she had been redesigned as an aircraft carrier, using the original cruiser hull and machinery. Commissioned in August 1943, Langley served in the Pacific theatre during World War II. The carrier was decommissioned at Philadelphia, Pennsylvania in February 1947.

Langley was taken out of "mothballs" early in 1951, refurbished and transferred to France under the Mutual Defense Assistance Program. Based in Toulon, La Fayette carried out many missions in the Far East until June 1953. During this action, her airgroup included Grumman F6F Hellcats and Curtiss SB2C Helldivers. Modernized in 1953–1954, she served in the Mediterranean and on the African coasts. In early 1956 she returned to Indo-China (which had been partitioned after the cease fire) equipped with Vought F4U Corsairs and Grumman TBF Avengers. She was involved in the Suez Crisis air and landing operations along with Arromanches and British carriers beginning in October 1956. In March 1960, La Fayette participated in the rescue operations in the Moroccan city of Agadir, damaged by an earthquake. It then took part in the repatriation of the first refugees from Algeria. After more than a decade of French Navy service, she was returned to the United States in March 1963 and was sold for scrap a year later.

In French service, La Fayette sailed nearly 350,000 nautical miles (650,000 km), her planes having carried out 19,805 landings. La Fayette was awarded the Military Cross for its first missions in Indo-China. The name of La Fayette is now carried by the frigate La Fayette.
