= Jean-Baptiste Le Paon =

French painter (1738–1785)

Jean-Baptiste Le Paon (1736/1738–1785) was a French painter and onetime military man known for his works depicting military battle scenes.

Through his uncle he was able to study under the Venetian painter of battle scenes Francesco Casanova.

He later became the principal painter to the war hero Louis Joseph, Prince of Condé and adorned the Palais Bourbon which the royal had purchased with battle scenes.

The Lafayette Memorial at Prospect Park in Brooklyn, New York City was executed according to the painting of the Marquis, Lafayette at Yorktown created by Le Paon. The aforementioned painting is now in the permanent collection of Lafayette College in Easton, Pennsylvania.

Works by Le Paon

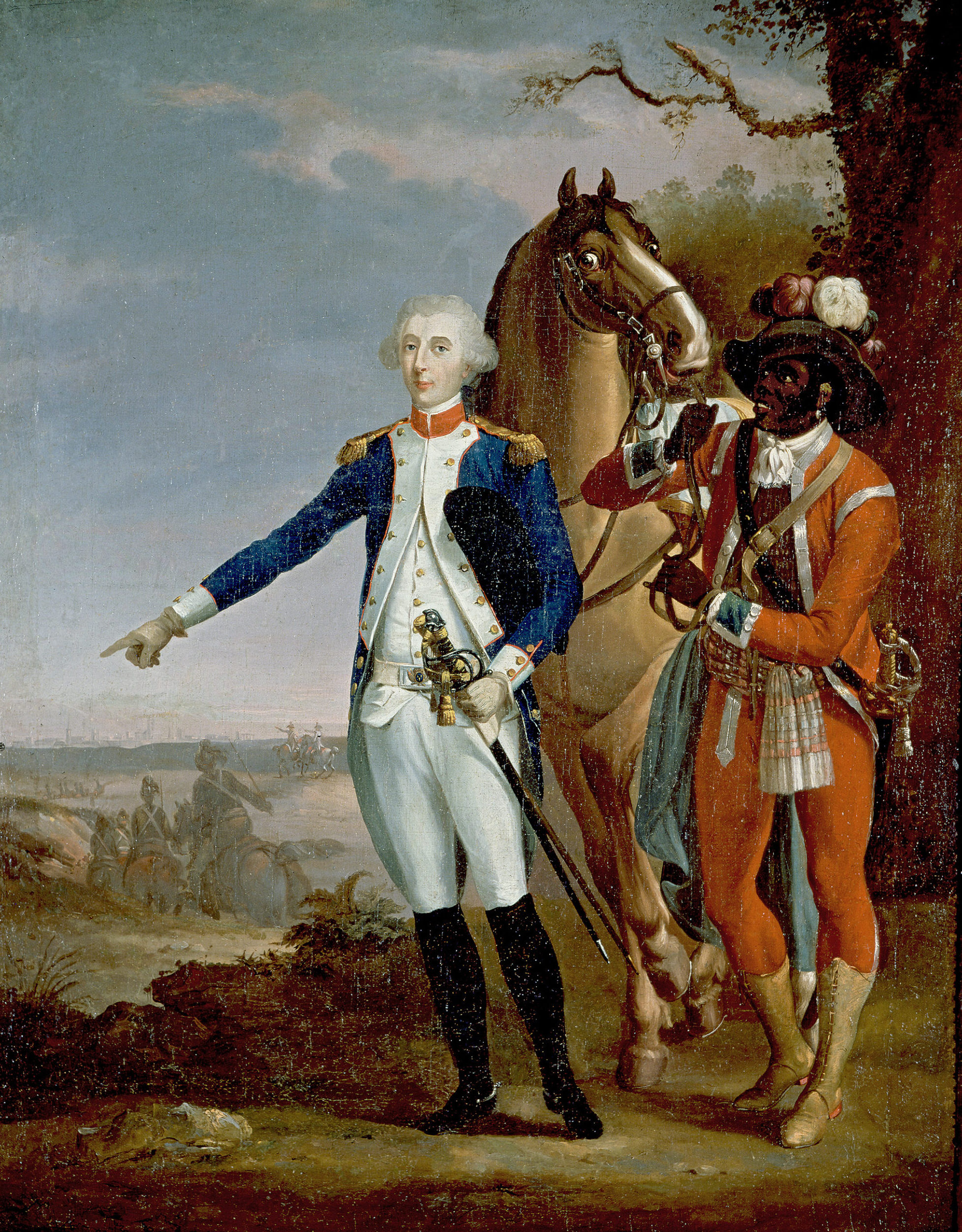
Lafayette at Yorktown, c. 1783–1785 (Lafayette College)

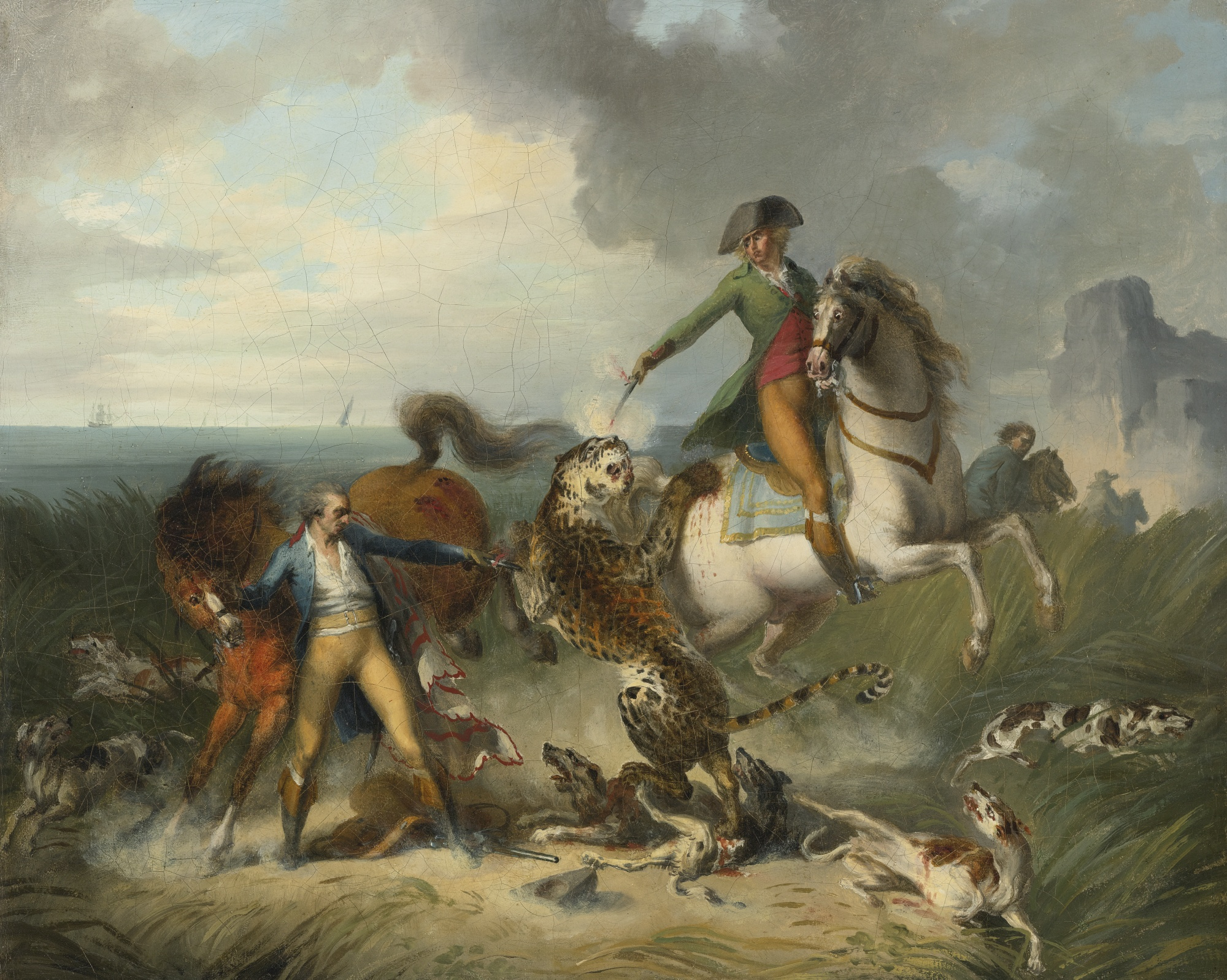
The Prince of Nassau and the Chevalier d'Oraison combating a jaguar on the coast of Argentina, 1784
