= USS Langley (CVL-27) =

Independence-class aircraft carrier of the US Navy in service 1943-1947

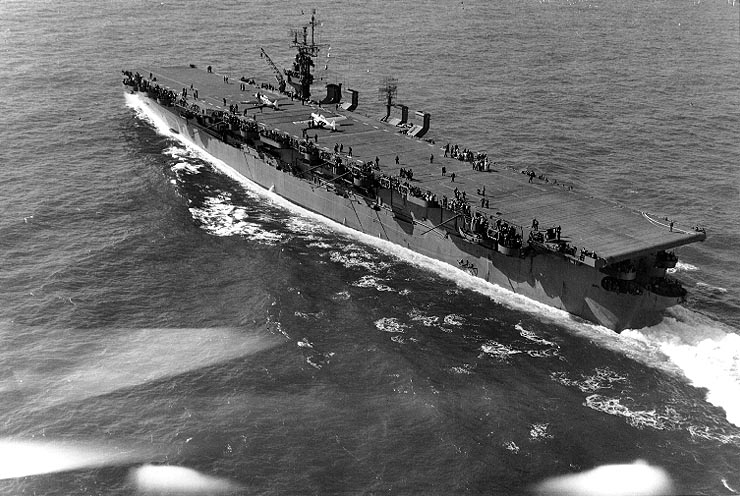
- USS Langley (October 1943)

History

United States
- Name: Fargo (CL-85) 9 September 1942; Crown Point (CV-27) 31 March 1942; Langley (CV-27) 13 November 1942
- Namesake: USS Langley (CV-1)
- Ordered: 9 September 1942 (as CL-85); 31 March 1942 (as CV-27)
- Builder: New York Shipbuilding Corporation
- Laid down: 11 April 1942
- Launched: 22 May 1943
- Commissioned: 31 August 1943
- Decommissioned: 11 February 1947
- Reclassified: CV-27, 31 March 1942; CVL-27, 15 July 1943
- Stricken: 20 March 1963
- Fate: Transferred to French Navy 8 January 1951, Scrapped 1964

France
- Name: La Fayette
- Acquired: 8 January 1951
- Commissioned: 2 June 1951
- Decommissioned: 20 March 1963
- Identification: R96
- Fate: Returned to US, 20 March 1963, Sold for scrapping 1963

General characteristics
- Class & type: Independence-class aircraft carrier
- Displacement: 11,000 tons
- Length: 622.5 ft (189.7 m)
- Beam: 71.5 ft (21.8 m) (waterline); 109 ft 2 in (33.27 m) (overall)
- Draft: 26 ft (7.9 m)
- Speed: 31 knots (57 km/h; 36 mph)
- Complement: 1,569 officers and enlisted
- Armament: 26 × 40 mm guns
- Aircraft carried: 45 aircraft

USS Langley (CVL-27) was an Independence-class light aircraft carrier that served the United States Navy from 1943 to 1947, and French Navy as La Fayette from 1951 to 1963.

== Career ==
Langley was named for Samuel Pierpont Langley, American scientist and aviation pioneer. She carried on the name and tradition of USS Langley (CV-1), the first U.S. Navy aircraft carrier, which had been sunk on 27 February 1942. The ship was originally ordered as a Cleveland-class light cruiser and named Fargo (CL‑85). She was laid down as USS Crown Point (CV‑27) by New York Shipbuilding Corporation, Camden, New Jersey United States on 11 April 1942 and renamed Langley on 13 November 1942.

=== 1943 ===
Langley was launched on 22 May 1943 and commissioned on 31 August 1943. After shakedown in the Caribbean Sea, Langley departed Philadelphia on 6 December 1943 for Pearl Harbor, where she participated in training operations.

=== 1944 ===
On 19 January 1944, she sailed with Task Force 58 (TF 58) for the attack on the Marshall Islands. From 29 January to 6 February, Langley's Carrier Air Group 32 (CVG-32) conducted raids on Wotje and Taroa Island to support the landings at Kwajalein, and from 10 through 28 February at Eniwetok. After a brief respite at Espiritu Santo, New Hebrides, Langley's aircraft hit Japanese positions on Palau, Yap, and Woleai, Caroline Islands, from 30 March to 1 April. She next proceeded to New Guinea to take part in the capture of Hollandia on 25 April. A mere 4 days later, the carrier engaged in the 2‑day strike against the Japanese bastion Truk. During the raid, Langley and her aircraft accounted for some 35 enemy planes destroyed or damaged, while losing only one aircraft herself.

Langley next departed Majuro on 7 June 1944 for the Mariana and Palau Islands campaign. On 11 June, TF 58 launched a strike of 208 fighters and eight torpedo bombers against enemy bases and airfields on Saipan and Tinian. From 11 June to 8 August, Langley operated with TF 58 and also took part in the Battle of the Philippine Sea, 19 to 20 June 1944.

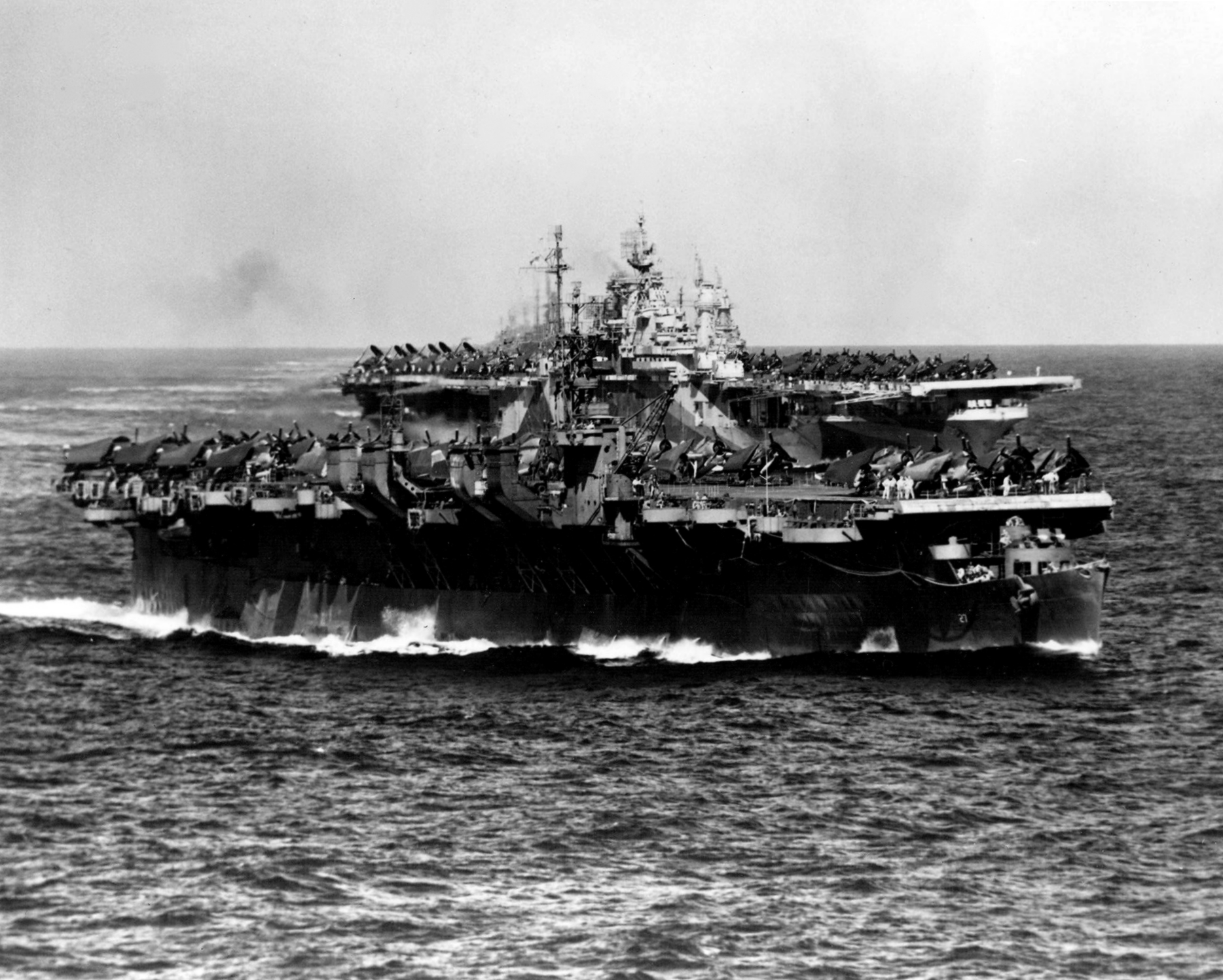
Langley leads Task Group 38.3 into Ulithi anchorage, 12 December 1944.

The carrier departed Eniwetok on 29 August and sortied with TF 38, under the command of Adm. William F. Halsey for air assaults on Peleliu and airfields in the Philippines as the preliminary steps in the invasion of the Palaus from 15 to 20 September 1944. During October, she operated off Formosa and the Pescadores Islands. Later in the month, TF 38 supported the landings on Leyte. The Japanese efforts to stop the U.S. advance included the counterattack by most available major fleet units ("Operation Sho-Go"). On 24 October, Langley's planes took part in the Battle of the Sibuyan Sea. Aircraft of TF 38 attacked the Japanese Center Force, as it steamed toward the San Bernardino Strait and the American beachhead at Tacloban. The Japanese units temporarily retired. The following day, upon word of Japanese aircraft carriers north of Leyte, TF 38 raced to intercept. In the ensuing Battle off Cape Engaño, the Japanese lost four carriers, two battleships, four heavy cruisers, one light cruiser, and five destroyers. Langley's aircraft assisted in the destruction of the carriers Zuihō and Zuikaku, the latter being the only remaining carrier of the six that had participated in the Pearl Harbor attack.

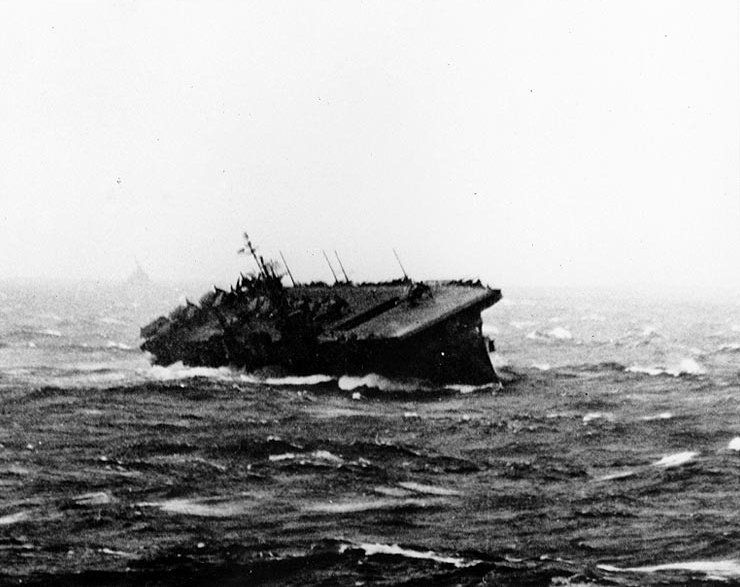
Langley rolling heavily to starboard during Typhoon Cobra, 18 December 1944. Taken from USS Essex.

During November 1944, Langley supported the Philippine landings and strikes the Manila Bay area. Aircraft of Langley's CVG-44 attacked Japanese reinforcement convoys, and airfields on Luzon and in the Cape Engaño area. On 1 December, the carrier withdrew to Ulithi for reprovisioning.

=== 1945 ===
During January 1945, Langley participated in the South China Sea raid supporting Invasion of Lingayen Gulf. Raids were made against Formosa, French Indochina, and the China coast from 30 December 1944 to 25 January 1945. Langley's task group was attacked by two dive bombers on 21 January. One 50 kg (110 lb) bomb struck the center of Langley's flight deck forward and penetrated to the gallery deck to explode among the officers' staterooms just aft of the forecastle. The fire was quickly extinguished, and the flight deck repaired to continue flight operations. The second bomber inflicted greater damage on USS Ticonderoga.

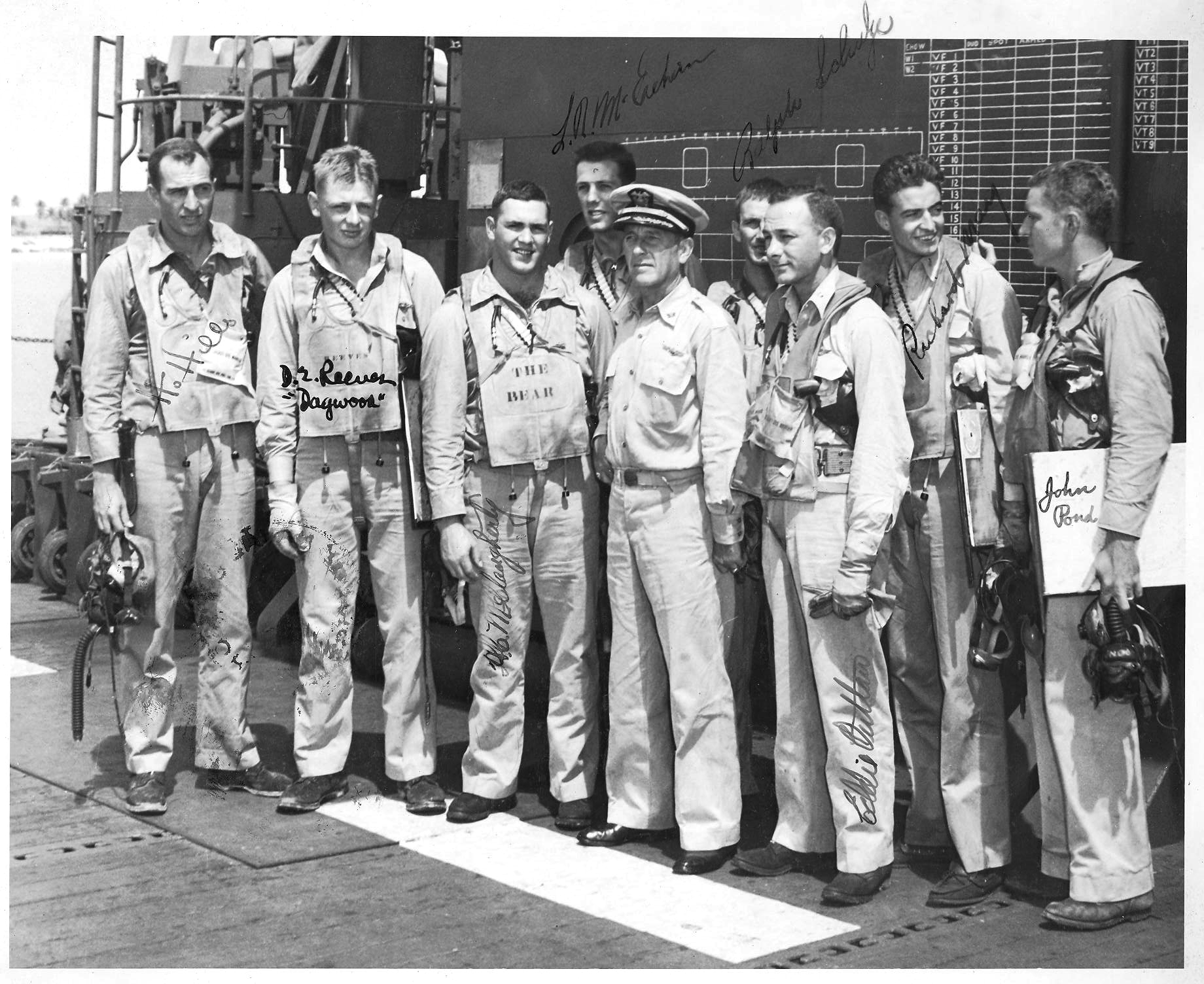
Pilots of VF-32 on USS Langley

Langley next joined in the sweeps against Tokyo and Nansei Shoto in support of the landings on Iwo Jima between 10 February and 18 March 1945. She next raided airfields on the Japanese homeland, and arrived off Okinawa on 23 March. Until 11 May, the ship operated either off Okinawa or took part in strikes on Kyushu, Japan, in an effort to destroy kamikaze bases in southern Japan which were launching desperate and deadly suicide attacks.

After touching Ulithi and Pearl Harbor, she steamed to San Francisco, arriving on 3 June for repairs and modernization at the Hunters Point Naval Shipyard. She departed 1 August and reached Pearl Harbor on 8 August 1945. While there, word arrived that hostilities had ended. She completed two "Magic Carpet" voyages to the Pacific, transporting soldiers back to the United States, and got underway on 1 October for Philadelphia.

=== 1946 ===
She departed from that port 15 November for the first of two trips to Europe transporting U.S. Army troops returning home from that theater. She returned to Philadelphia on 6 January 1946 and was assigned to the Atlantic Reserve Fleet, Philadelphia Group, on 31 May 1946. Langley was decommissioned on 11 February 1947.

== Transfer to France ==
Langley was taken out of "mothballs", refurbished and transferred to France under the Mutual Defense Assistance Program on 8 January 1951. After more than a decade of French Navy service as La Fayette, she was returned to the United States on 20 March 1963 and sold to the Boston Metals Co., Baltimore, Maryland, for scrapping.
