= Lists of United States commemorative coins =

Lists of United States commemorative coins and medals include:

- List of United States commemorative coins before 1900
- List of United States commemorative coins (1900s)
- List of United States commemorative coins (1910s)
- List of United States commemorative coins (1920s)
- List of United States commemorative coins (1930s)
- List of United States commemorative coins (1940s)
- List of United States commemorative coins (1950s)
- List of United States commemorative coins (1970s)
- List of United States commemorative coins (1980s)
- List of United States commemorative coins (1990s)
- List of United States commemorative coins (2000s)
- List of United States commemorative coins (2010s)
- List of United States commemorative coins (2020s)

== See also ==
- United States commemorative coins
