= List of United States commemorative coins (1910s) =

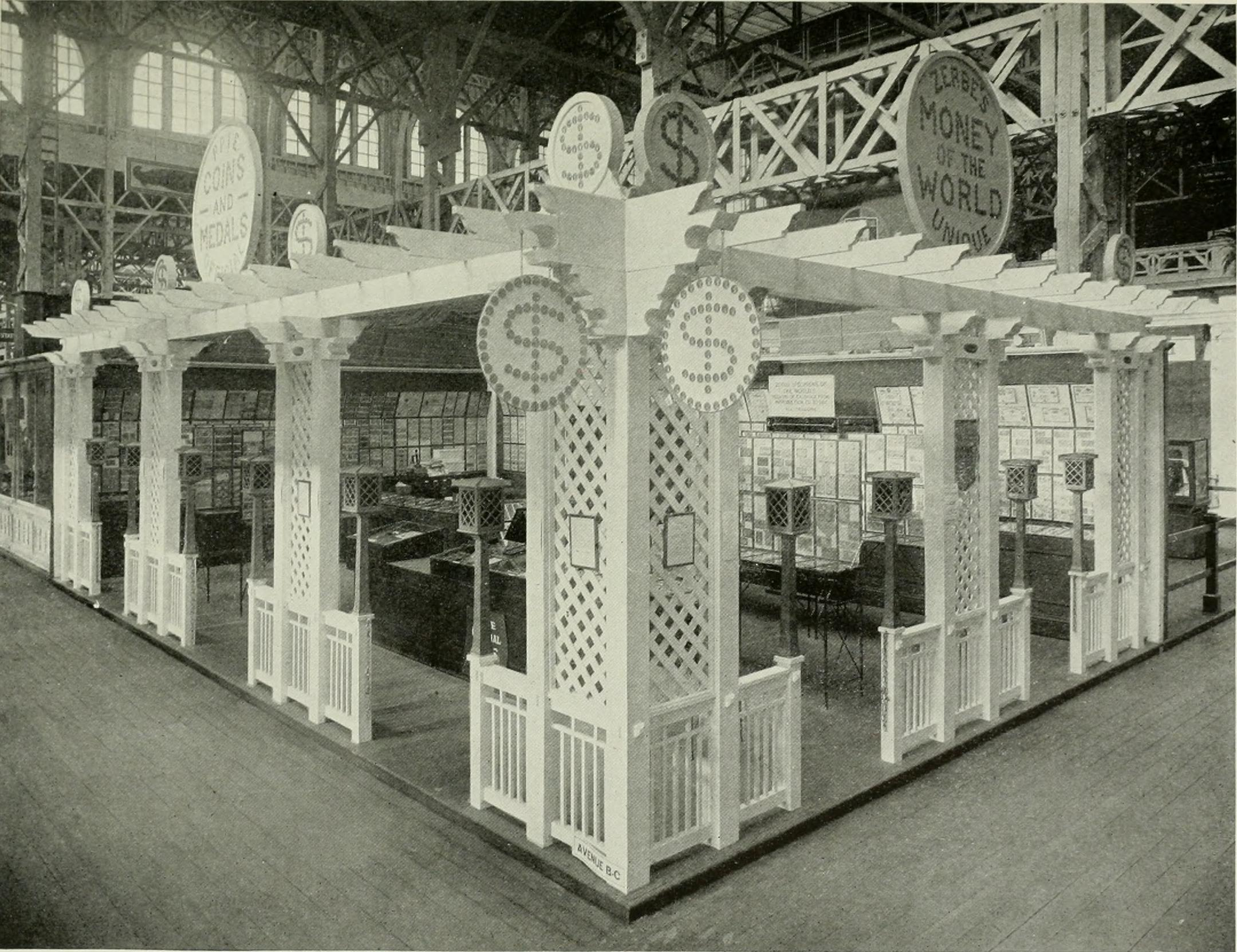
Farran Zerbe's exhbit at the Panama–Pacific International Exposition. Zerbe was the distributor of the Panama–Pacific commemorative coins.

The United States has struck commemorative coins since 1848 to commemorate the anniversaries of people, places, and events. Commemorative coins have a face value and are legal tender, though they are sold at premium as souvenirs. Most commemorative coins are sold to coin collectors. The classic era of commemorative coins began in 1892 with the issuance of the Columbian Exposition half dollar. This list includes the major varieties of United States commemorative coins struck in the 1910s.

Five commemorative coins were issued for the 1915 Panama–Pacific International Exposition. Distribution of the coins was controlled by numismatist and coin dealer Farran Zerbe, who had become unpopular with coin collectors. Coin sales fell short and unsold coins were melted. After similar poor sales, McKinley Birthplace Memorial dollars were sold to coin dealers, such as B. Max Mehl, who resold the coins later for profit.

The Illinois Centennial half dollar became the first commemorative coin issued to sell out, with none being returned to the United States Mint to be melted.

== Commemorative coins ==
(P)	No mint mark, struck at the Philadelphia Mint
S	S mint mark, struck at the San Francisco Mint

Commemorative coins issued by the United States in the 1910s
Coin	Year(s)	Obverse design	Reverse design	Designer	Composition	Mintage (mint)	Obverse	Reverse	Ref.
Panama Pacific Exposition half dollar	1915	Columbia and a child in front of the Golden Gate	Eagle perched on a shield	Charles E. Barber (obverse) and George T. Morgan (reverse)	90% silver, 10% copper	60,030 (Note: 32,896 coins were melted. 30 coins were for assay.) S			
Panama Pacific Exposition dollar	1915	Panama Canal laborer wearing a cap	Two dolphins	Charles Keck	90% gold, 10% copper	25,034 (Note: 10,034 coins were melted. 34 coins were for assay.) S			
Panama Pacific Exposition quarter eagle	1915	Columbia riding a hippocampus	Perched eagle	Charles E. Barber (obverse) and George T. Morgan (reverse)	90% gold, 10% copper	10,017 (Note: 3,268 coins were melted. 17 coins were for assay.) S			
Panama Pacific Exposition half union (round)	1915	Minerva wearing a helmet	Owl on a pine branch	Robert Ingersoll Aitken	90% gold, 10% copper	1,510 (Note: 1,027 coins were melted. 10 coins were for assay.) S			
Panama Pacific Exposition half union (octagonal)	1915	Minerva wearing a helmet	Owl on a pine branch	Robert Ingersoll Aitken	90% gold, 10% copper	1,509 (Note: 864 coins were melted. 9 coins were for assay.) S			
McKinley Birthplace Memorial dollar	1916	Portrait of William McKinley	National McKinley Birthplace Memorial	Charles E. Barber (obverse) and George T. Morgan (reverse)	90% gold, 10% copper	20,026 (Note: An estimated 5,000 coins were melted. 26 coins were for assay.) (P)			
McKinley Birthplace Memorial dollar	1917	Portrait of William McKinley	National McKinley Birthplace Memorial	Charles E. Barber (obverse) and George T. Morgan (reverse)	90% gold, 10% copper	10,014 (Note: An estimated 5,000 coins were melted. 14 coins were for assay.) (P)			
Illinois Centennial half dollar	1918	Portrait of Abraham Lincoln without a beard	Eagle with a shield and a ribbon, from the seal of Illinois	George T. Morgan (obverse) and John R. Sinnock (reverse)	90% silver, 10% copper	100,058 (Note: 58 coins were for assay.) (P)			
