= United States commemorative coins =

Commemorative coins of the United States

The United States Mint has minted numerous commemorative coins to commemorate persons, places, events, and institutions since 1848. Many of these coins are not intended for general circulation, but are still legal tender. The mint also produces commemorative medals, which are similar to coins but do not have a face value, and therefore are not legal tender.

== History ==
=== Early commemoratives ===
The earliest commemorative coin minted by the US Mint was the 1848 "CAL" quarter eagle, which commemorated the finding of gold in California. These coins were standard quarter eagles that were modified by punching CAL. onto the reverse above the eagle.

Most standard US commemorative coin lists begin with the 1892 Columbian half dollar commemorating the 400th anniversary of Columbus' voyage to America. The following year, the Columbian Exposition quarter dollar featuring Queen Isabella of Spain was issued.

In 1915, the mint issued the Panama–Pacific half union, which had a face value of $50. This was the first time a commemorative coin was produced in a denomination that was not issued for circulation (a half union coin was proposed, but was never released into circulation). The coin was offered in both round and octagonal versions, the latter being the only US coin that is not round.

In 1925, a commemorative 50-cent coin was released that showed Robert E. Lee and Stonewall Jackson. Money raised from the sale of the coins was combined with money raised by the United Daughters of the Confederacy and the Stone Mountain Confederate Memorial Association in order to fund the carving of a Confederate monument at Stone Mountain.

The 1926 United States Sesquicentennial half dollar was the second United States coin to feature a living person at the time of its minting. The obverse of the coin featured busts of George Washington and Calvin Coolidge. (The first was the 1921 Alabama Centennial half dollar, which showed a bust of then-Governor Thomas Kilby.)

Starting in the 1930s, the US Mint was criticized for issuing commemorative coins of dubious recognition and seemingly endless mint runs (the Oregon Trail Memorial 50-cent piece was minted 8 years during a 14-year span). Multiple unrelated commemoratives also were minted in many years, diminishing the significance of commemorative issues. In 1936 alone 19 commemorative half dollars were minted, not including two half dollars that were dated 1936 but were actually minted the following year. Three commemorative half dollars were proposed for issue in 1954, but all were vetoed by president Dwight D. Eisenhower due to the lack of interest expressed by collectors, and the period of early commemoratives ended that year with the 1954 Carver-Washington half dollar.

=== Modern commemoratives ===
In 1982, the US Mint resumed its commemorative coin program with the George Washington 250th Anniversary half dollar. Unlike the original commemoratives, only a few coins are released each year and are more popular with collectors.

The Library of Congress eagle of 2000 was the first bi-metallic coin issued by the US Mint. Later that year, the mint released a 1,000 Icelandic króna coin commemorating the 1,000th anniversary of Leif Ericson's discovery of the Americas. This coin was struck on the same planchet as the silver dollar that also commemorated the event.

The year 2017 marked the 225th anniversary of the US Mint. Although no traditional commemorative coins were issued for the occasion, the mint did produce a $100 coin, a special uncirculated mint set featuring coins with an "enhanced" finish, and a circulating penny featuring the P mint mark.

== Collecting ==
Modern numismatists have devised several ways to collect the vast series of commemorative issues from the Mint. One of the most popular is to assemble a "type set" of issues, or one of each different issue minted. (For example, though the Oregon Trail half dollars were minted over a period of 14 years, only one issue is needed for a type collection). This allows collectors to avoid the rare varieties such as the Alabama Centennial half dollar with 2x2 mark and Grant "With Star" variety half dollar.

Still others attempt to assembly a full set of each date, mint mark, and finish of coins, totaling 144 for the classic commemorative series.

In 1983, a group of collectors formed the Society of U.S. Commemorative Coins. The group published a quarterly journal and conducted meetings at many of the major coin conventions around the country. The group disbanded in 2011 amid declining membership.

== Circulating commemorative coins ==
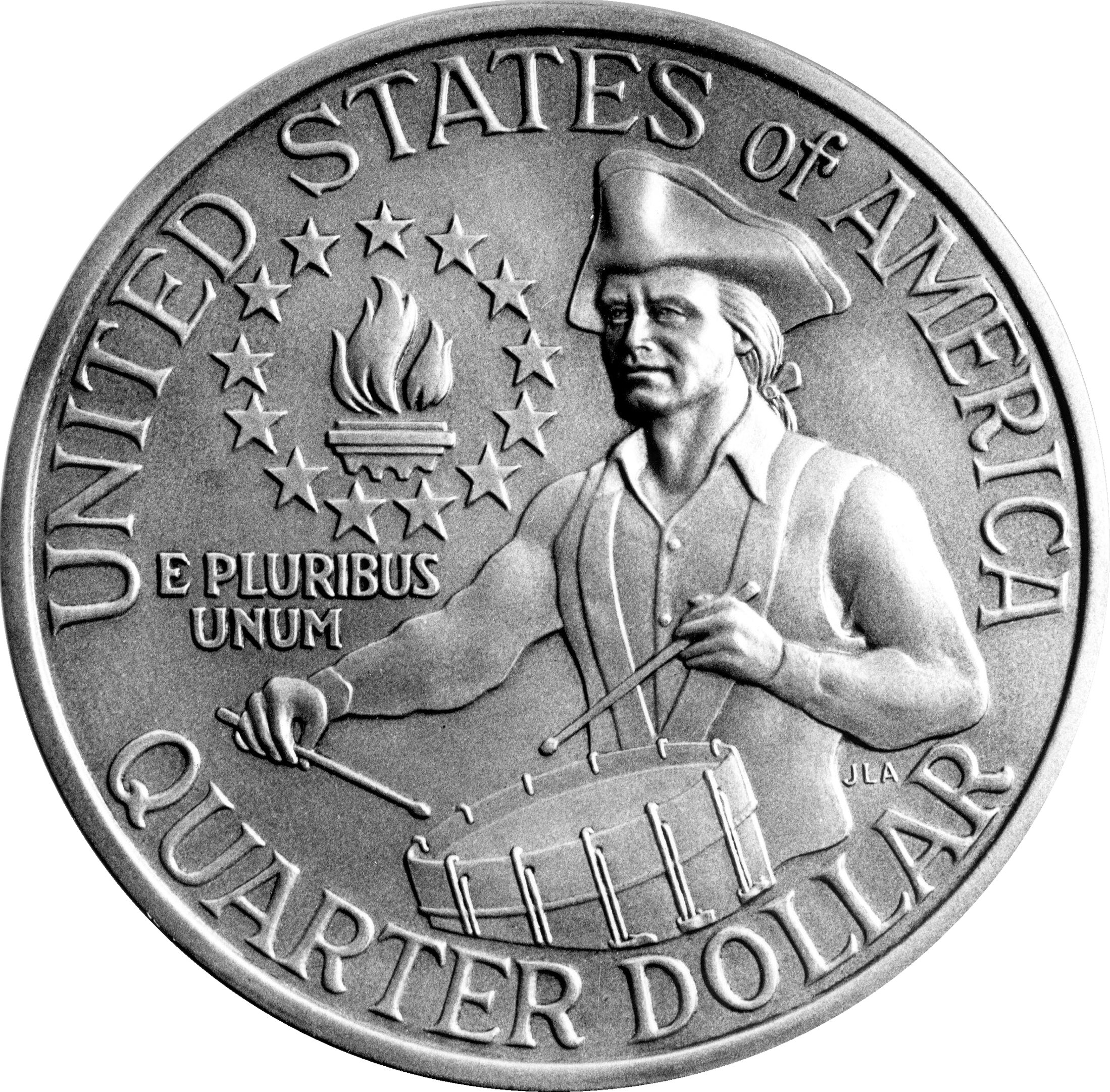
Reverse of the United States Bicentennial quarter

Circulating commemorative coins have been somewhat more unusual in the United States. These are coins that are minted to commemorate a particular person, place, event, or institution, but are intended to enter general circulation.

All US Bicentennial commemoratives were dated 1776–1976, despite being produced throughout 1975–76.

=== Dollar coins ===
The first commemorative coin of the United States made specifically as a circulation issue was the 1921 Peace dollar. The coin was originally intended to be produced for one year to commemorate the end of World War I, although the design proved popular and continued to be produced until silver dollar production ended in 1935.

In 1975 and 1976, the Eisenhower dollar was issued for circulation, among other commemorative coins in those years.

The Susan B. Anthony dollar was minted from 1979 to 1981, and then again in 1999.

The Dolley Madison silver dollar was available to buy in 1999, made to commemorate the 150th anniversary of Dolley Madison’s death.

The presidential dollar coins, the first of which was released in 2007, commemorate deceased presidents of the United States. While the program ended in 2016 when the last eligible president, Ronald Reagan, was commemorated, a George H. W. Bush coin was released in 2020.

2009 saw the release of the first Native American dollar coin, to depict "images celebrating the important contributions made by Indian tribes and individual Native Americans to the development of the United States and the history of the United States." The act also called for the removal of the date from the obverse and "E PLURIBUS UNUM" from the reverse of the coin, opting instead to add them to the edge.

In 2018, the American Innovation $1 Coin Program was launched. The program will run from 2019 to 2032, commemorating an inventor or an invention from each state and six territories. An introductory coin was released in 2018. These coins do not circulate as of 2019, as no dollar coins have been minted for circulation since 2012 due to a lack of demand. Should there be a need for more dollar coins before 2032, however, some American Innovation dollars may enter circulation.

=== Half dollars ===
Several issues of commemorative half dollars were released into circulation to initially poor sales. The next planned circulating commemorative coin was a half dollar to commemorate the 200th anniversary of the birth of George Washington. The coin was to have been struck for one year only in 1932, however, no circulating half dollars were struck from 1930 until 1934 due to a lack of demand caused by the Great Depression. The anniversary was instead commemorated with the Washington quarter, which, like the Peace dollar, later became a regular issue coin.

The Kennedy half dollar, first released in March 1964 as a memorial to the assassinated 35th president of the United States John F. Kennedy, became hoarded by collectors, and those interested in a memento of the late president, and for the silver content of the coin, and were seldom seen in circulation despite increased production and periodic decrease of silver content. A special design for the reverse of the half dollar was issued for the United States Bicentennial, struck. Production of the circulating coin was then ended in 2001, but in 2021 began again to be produced for general circulation.

Half dollars in 2026 have a new circulating commemorative design as part of the United States Semiquincentennial coinage series, part of the observance of the 250th anniversary of American independence. This new design features the Statue of Liberty on the obverse, with her torch being passed from one generation to the next on the reverse.

=== Quarters ===
In 1975 and 1976, the Washington quarter was issued and circulated to commemorate the United States Bicentennial.

In 1999, the State Quarters program began circulating five different commemoratives each year with reverses for each of the 50 States in the order of their admission to the Union. In 2009, six quarters commemorating the District of Columbia, two commonwealths, and three territories were issued.

Beginning in 2010 and continuing through 2021, a series of quarters, the America the Beautiful Quarters, was issued to recognize America's National Parks, with five quarters issued per year.

The American Women quarters program, authorized by the Circulating Collectible Coin Redesign Act of 2020, sponsored by Representatives Barbara Lee and Anthony Gonzalez, will comprise a series featuring notable women in U.S. history, commemorating the centennial of the Nineteenth Amendment to the United States Constitution. The United States Mint issued five designs each year from 2022 to 2025 for up to 20 total designs. One woman will be honored on the reverse of each coin, selected for "contributions to the United States in a wide spectrum of accomplishments and fields, including but not limited to suffrage, civil rights, abolition, government, humanities, science, space, and arts." The obverse depicts George Washington with a 1932 design from Laura Gardin Fraser. The design was previously used for the George Washington half eagle issued in 1999, the 200th anniversary of George Washington's death. Honorees for 2022 are:Maya Angelou - January 2022, Sally Ride - March 2022, Wilma Mankiller - June 2022, Adelina Otero-Warren, and Anna May Wong.

The mint will issue five new quarter designs as part of the United States Semiquincentennial coinage series, part of the observance of the 250th anniversary of American independence in 2026. This series was also authorized by the Circulating Collectible Coin Redesign Act of 2020.

=== Dimes ===
The mint redesigned the dime as part of the United States Semiquincentennial coinage series in 2026. The obverse features a bust of Liberty, with an obverse featuring an eagle and the added inscription "Liberty Over Tyranny".

=== Nickels ===
In 2004–2005 the mint issued four commemorative Westward Journey nickels, celebrating the 200th anniversaries of the Louisiana Purchase and the Corps of Discovery.

Nickels in 2026 are minted with a dual-date 1776~2026 as part of the United States Semiquincentennial coinage series, part of the observance of the 250th anniversary of American independence.

=== One cent coins ===
In 2009, four commemorative one cent pieces were issued to mark the bicentennial of the birth of Abraham Lincoln.

In 2025, 232 circulating cents from Philadelphia and Denver were struck with an omega privy mark and sold in sets with a gold cent from Philadelphia to commemorate the end of the circulating cent coin.

Cents in 2026 are minted with a dual-date 1776~2026 in proof and mint sets as part of the United States Semiquincentennial coinage series, part of the observance of the 250th anniversary of American independence.

== Specifications of traditional commemorative coins ==
=== Quarter (25¢) ===
Composition	Diameter	Total weight	Years minted	Example
Ag 90%, Cu 10%	24.3 mm (0.957 in)	6.25 g	1893	

=== Half dollar (50¢) ===
Composition	Diameter	Total weight	Years minted	Example
Ag 90%, Cu 10%	30.61 mm (1.205 in)	12.50 g	1892–1954, 1982, 1993	
Cu 92%, Ni 8%	30.61 mm (1.205 in)	11.34 g	1986–present	
Cu 92%, Ni 8%	30.61 mm (1.205 in)	11.34 g	2014, 2019, 2020	

=== Dollar ($1) ===
Composition	Diameter	Total weight	Years minted	Example
Ag 90%, Cu 10%	38.1 mm (1.500 in)	26.73 g	1900, 1983–2018	
90% Au, 10% Cu	15.0 mm (0.590 in)	1.672 g	1903–1922	
Ag 99.9%	38.1 mm (1.500 in)	26.73 g	2019–present	
Ag 99.9%	76.2 mm (3.000 in)	155.517g	2019, 2020	

=== Quarter eagle ($2.50) ===
Composition	Diameter	Total weight	Years minted	Example
Au 90%, Cu 10%	18.0 mm (0.709 in)	4.18 g	1848, 1915, 1926	

=== Half eagle ($5) ===
Composition	Diameter	Total weight	Years minted	Example
Au 90%, Ag 6%, Cu 4%	21.59 mm (0.850 in)	8.359 g	1986–present	
Au 85%, Cu 14.8%, Zn .2%	21.59 mm (0.850 in)	7.931 g	2018	

=== Eagle ($10) ===
Composition	Diameter	Total weight	Years minted	Example
Au 90%, Ag 6%, Cu 4%	26.92 mm (1.060 in)	16.718 g	1984, 2003	
Au 48%, Pt 48%, Alloy 4%	26.92 mm (1.060 in)	16.259 g	2000	
Au 99.99%	26.49 mm (1.043 in)	14.175g	2007-2016, 2020	

=== Half union ($50) ===
Composition	Diameter	Total weight	Years minted	Example
Au 90%, Cu 10%	50.8 mm (2.000 in)	83.55 g	1915	
Au 90%, Cu 10%	44.9 mm (1.77 in)	75.54 g	1915	

== See also ==
- United States Sesquicentennial coinage
- United States Bicentennial coinage
- United States Semiquincentennial coinage
- 50 State Quarters
- District of Columbia and United States Territories Quarters
- America the Beautiful Quarters
- Presidential $1 Coin Program
- American Innovation $1 Coin Program
- Commemorative coins and medals by decade
  - 1800s
  - 1900s
  - 1910s
  - 1920s
  - 1930s
  - 1940s
  - 1950s
  - 1970s
  - 1980s
  - 1990s
  - 2000s
  - 2010s
  - 2020s
