= Illinois Centennial half dollar =

American commemorative coin

- United States
- Value: 50 cents (0.50 US dollars)
- Mass: 12.5 g
- Diameter: 30.61 mm (1.20 in)
- Thickness: 2.15 mm (0.08 in)
- Edge: Reeded
- Composition: 90.0% silver; 10.0% copper
- Silver: 0.36169 troy oz
- Years of minting: 1918
- Mintage: 100,058 including 58 pieces for the Assay Commission
- Mint marks: None, all pieces struck at the Philadelphia Mint without mint mark

Obverse
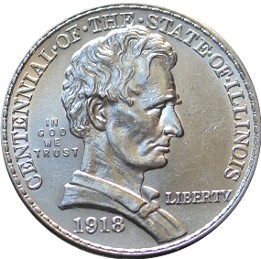
- Design: Abraham Lincoln
- Designer: George T. Morgan
- Design date: 1918

Reverse
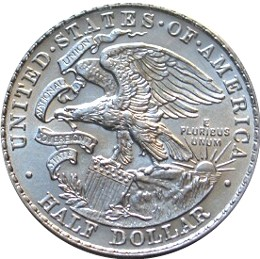
- Design: An eagle, adapted from the Seal of Illinois
- Designer: John R. Sinnock
- Design date: 1918

The Illinois Centennial half dollar is a commemorative 50-cent piece struck by the United States Bureau of the Mint in 1918. The obverse, depicting Abraham Lincoln, was designed by Chief Engraver George T. Morgan; the reverse, based on the Seal of Illinois, was by his assistant and successor, John R. Sinnock. Morgan's obverse is based on the statue by Andrew O'Connor.

A commemorative was wanted by the State of Illinois to mark the centennial of its 1818 admission to the Union, and in 1918, legislation was introduced into Congress to accomplish this. It met no opposition, though several amendments were made during the legislative process. After it passed, the two engravers produced designs, but Treasury Secretary William G. McAdoo required changes, not all of which were made.

The coins were minted in August 1918, and were sold to the public for $1 each. All sold, though many were held by a bank until 1933, and the profits used to defray the cost of local centennial celebrations or to help those in need because of World War I. Later writers have generally admired the coin, considering it one of the more handsome American commemoratives. The coin is valued in the hundreds of dollars today, though exceptional specimens may trade for more.

== Legislation ==
The State of Illinois wanted a commemorative coin to be issued for the centennial of its 1818 admission to the Union. A bill that would accomplish this, H.R. 8764, was introduced into the U.S. House of Representatives on January 16, 1918, by that state's Loren E. Wheeler. It was referred to the Committee on Coinage, Weights, and Measures, which held hearings on March 5. Wheeler told the committee (of which he was not a member) that the coins were desired for distribution during the celebrations in Illinois. He had been to see Treasury Secretary William G. McAdoo and Mint Director Raymond T. Baker. Neither had any objection to the legislation, though McAdoo had explained that the problem with commemorative coins was that they did not sell as well as expected, and many were returned to the Mint for melting. After telling of his meeting with the officials, Wheeler explained to the committee that the coins would be purchased by the State Treasurer of Illinois and so there would be no returns. James L. Slayden of Texas asked what the cost to the federal government would be, but Wheeler did not know. Slayden asked what had been the cost for the 1916–1917 McKinley Birthplace Memorial dollar, and Ohio's William A. Ashbrook, the chairman of the committee, said that the cost of the dies had been borne by the group purchasing the coins from the government; Ashbrook proposed amending the bill to make this clear this would be an expense to be paid by Illinois. Wheeler had no objection, and stated that to avoid returns, it might be best if the issue was limited to 100,000 coins rather than the 200,000 in the original bill. Ashbrook then asked if the coins were to be sold at a premium by the centennial committee, and Wheeler denied this, indicating that they were to be circulated like any other half dollar. This concluded the public hearing on the bill, with the committee to take further action in executive session.

On March 12, Ashbrook submitted a report on behalf of his committee recommending passage of the bill once it had been amended to reduce the authorized mintage from 200,000 to 100,000 and to add a statement that the United States government would not be responsible for the cost of the dies.

Wheeler presented the bill on the floor of the House of Representatives on April 6, 1918. He was quizzed by North Carolina's Claude Kitchin, who asked whether there had been a unanimous recommendation by the committee, whether McAdoo and Baker had approved the bill, and whether there was precedent for a half dollar in honor of a state's centennial (there was not). Wheeler reassured Kitchin as to the unanimity of the committee, and the approval by the officials, but did not answer the centennial question definitively, instead citing instances of prior commemorative issues (the Louisiana Purchase Exposition dollar and the Panama-Pacific commemorative coins). Ashbrook intervened, assuring Kitchin that his committee had unanimously approved it. Kitchin had no more questions, and the House approved the bill without a recorded vote.

H. R. 8742 was transmitted to the Senate, where it was referred to the Committee on Banking and Currency. That committee's chairman, Oklahoma's Robert L. Owen, reported it back with an amendment to the full Senate, where the bill was considered on May 21, 1918. The House-passed bill had said the laws relating to the minor coinage of the United States (the cent and nickel) would apply to the coin; this was changed to state that the laws relating to the subsidiary silver coinage (which the half dollar was) would apply. The bill was passed as amended without objection. Later in the day, Illinois Senator James Hamilton Lewis made a statement which was inserted in the Congressional Record at this point, applauding the passage of the honor to his home state, and noting that "more than a hundred thousand of her sons" were then being deployed to the battlefields of World War I.

Since the versions the two houses had passed were not identical, the bill returned to the House of Representatives, where on May 25, Arizona's Carl Hayden successfully moved that the House agree to the Senate amendment. The Speaker, Champ Clark, felt that the title of the bill might have to be changed for reasons he did not explain, but Hayden disagreed and Clark did not press his point. The bill passed the House, and was enacted by the signature of President Woodrow Wilson on June 1, 1918.

== Preparation and design ==
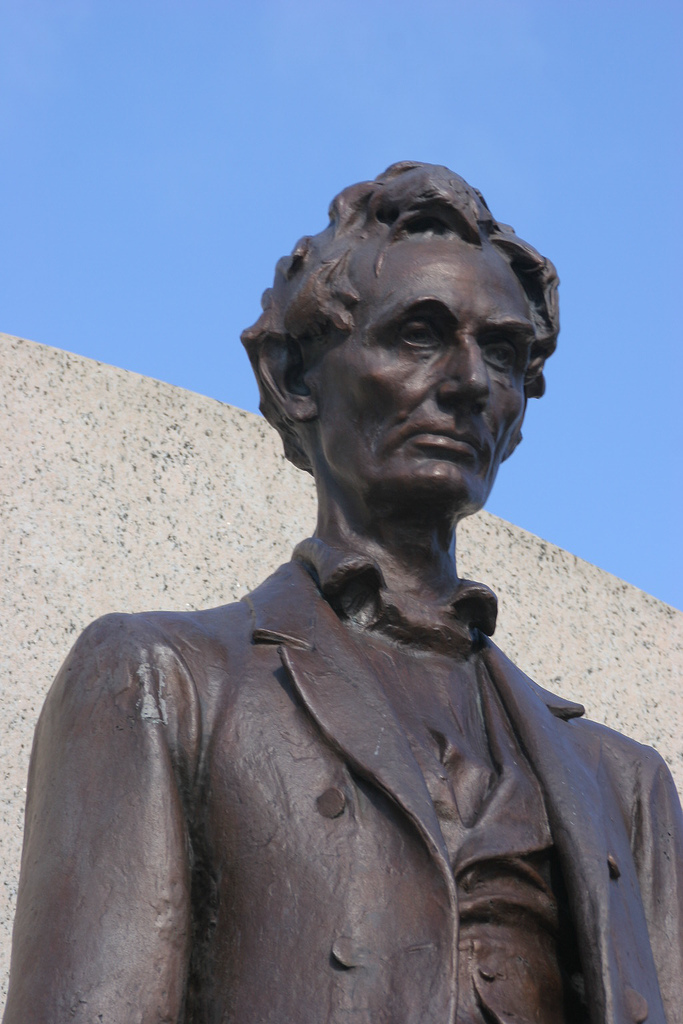
Part of the statue of Lincoln by Andrew O'Connor on the State Capitol grounds at Springfield, Illinois

The designs were prepared internally in the Engraving Department at the Philadelphia Mint. The obverse design, depicting Abraham Lincoln, was created by Chief Engraver George T. Morgan. The Chief Engraver worked from a photograph of a statue of Lincoln designed by Andrew O'Connor and unveiled in Springfield (the city where Lincoln lived for much of his adult life) in August 1918. Lincoln is shown beardless, as he was when living in Illinois before he was elected president in 1860. He was chosen to be on the coin as Illinois' most famous resident. The obverse also contains the mottoes LIBERTY and IN GOD WE TRUST, as well as an inscription noting the centennial.

The reverse was designed by the assistant engraver who would succeed Morgan on his death in 1925, John R. Sinnock. It is an adaptation of the Seal of Illinois, an eagle perched on a rock mound, with the rising Sun beyond it. The bird holds in its beak a scroll with the Illinois state motto, STATE SOVEREIGNTY, NATIONAL UNION and it clutches the Federal shield. An olive branch is seen, but without any arrows representing war, even though these symbols are often paired on U.S. coins. Anthony Swiatek and Walter Breen suggested "their presence on a coin designed during the concluding months of World War I might have been considered just a bit raw". The reverse also bears the legends, UNITED STATES OF AMERICA, E PLURIBUS UNUM (the national motto, meaning "out of many, one") and HALF DOLLAR.

The reverse of the coin is based on the Seal of Illinois.

Secretary McAdoo had originally rejected the submissions. Acting Mint Director Mary M. O'Reilly wrote to Philadelphia Mint Superintendent Adam M. Joyce on June 24, 1918, relaying the Treasury Secretary's concerns. McAdoo "specifically direct[ed]" that the Illinois state motto be deleted from the scroll in the eagle's beak on the reverse, to be replaced with the national one. Joyce was told to follow the provisions of the Coinage Act of 1873 requiring that on one side there be the word LIBERTY, a design emblematic of it, and the year of striking, with the other side an eagle with the name of the country and the denomination of the coin. Despite McAdoo's order, the Illinois inscription was retained on the scroll. Don Taxay, in his book on commemoratives, speculated it might have been the Illinois Centennial Commission that had insisted on this.

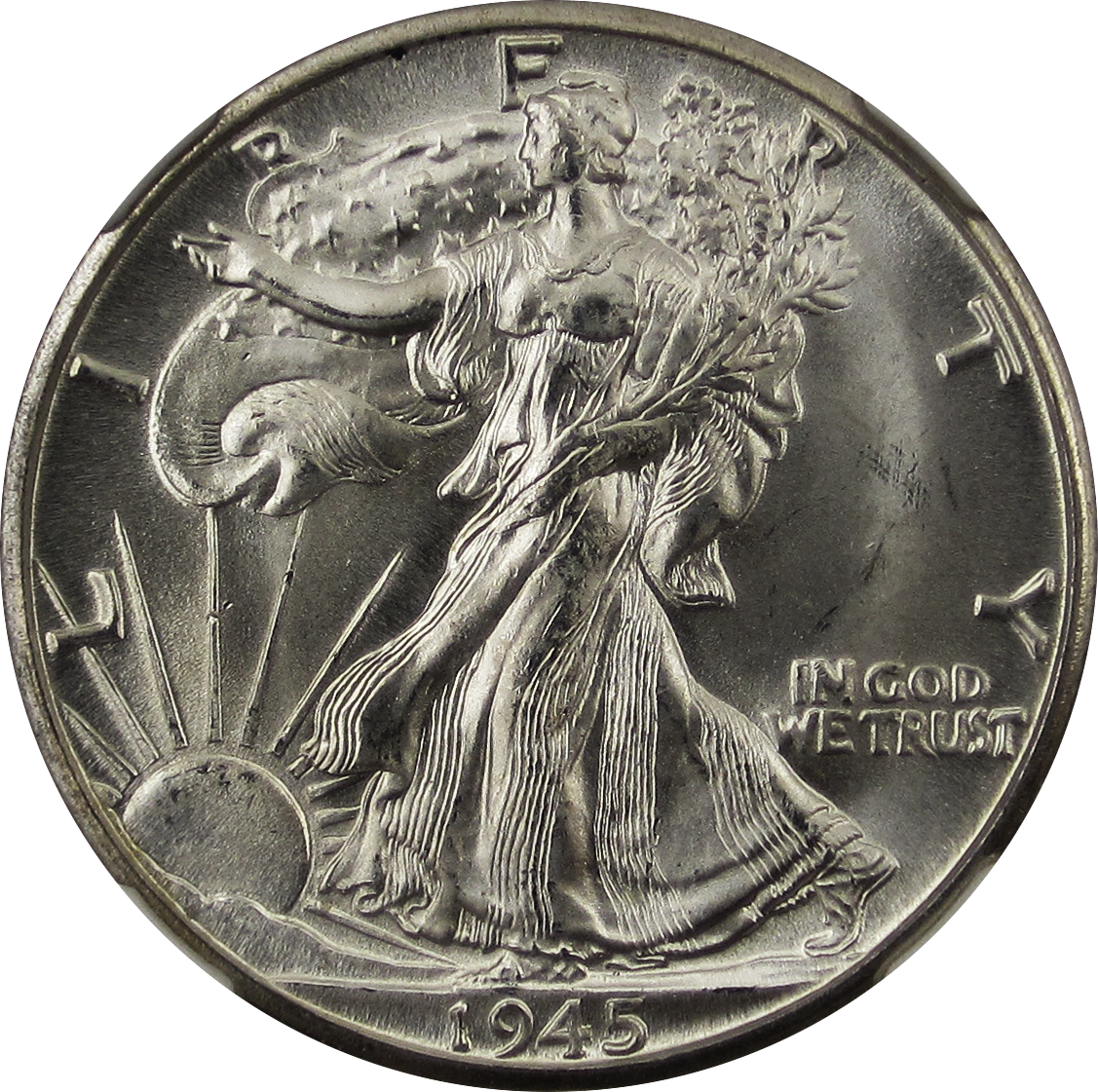
Cornelius Vermeule felt that the use of the Sun on the Illinois coin recalled works such as the Walking Liberty half dollar (first issued 1916).

Later commentators have praised the coin. Taxay deemed the obverse "undoubtedly the finest work Morgan ever did in his forty-eight years with the Mint. The head is not merely well drawn, there is in it a depth of feeling, and introspective mood that almost makes the observer feel he is intruding on the great man." Writers on commemorative coins, including Arlie Slabaugh and David M. Bullowa, also admired the Illinois piece. Q. David Bowers deemed Sinnock's reverse "the finest work he ever did for a legal tender coin", not excluding the Roosevelt dime (1946) and Franklin half dollar (1948, posthumous). Bowers noted that the border of both sides of the coin consists of beads and pellets, "an attractive substitute for denticles".

Art historian Cornelius Vermeule, in his 1971 book on the artistry of American coins and medals, wrote that "Morgan's interpretation has captured the restless plasticity of [O'Connor's] bust, yet another indication of the benefits for coin design of good monumental models in sculpture". He noted of Sinnock's reverse, "the little burst of sun at the right is almost a bow to the Roty–Saint-Gaudens–Weinman developments outside the Philadelphia Mint in American numismatic taste and iconography in the generation following 1900. Sinnock's composition can be called conventional, but the entire aura of the coin reflects American art after the Civil War, and this is perhaps truly appropriate for the only [pre-1954] commemorative coin to honor Abraham Lincoln."

== Production, distribution, and collecting ==
The people of Illinois will be pardoned if they feel a little "chesty" over their Illinois Centennial half dollar. Besides being a very handsome piece of money, it is the first of its class to be issued by the government. None of our previous souvenir coins has been for the purpose of commemorating an occasion, event or undertaking that was confined entirely by the boundaries of a single state. It is distinctly an Illinois coin.

— Frank G. Duffield, editor of The Numismatist, at the 1918 convention of the American Numismatic Association in Philadelphia

A total of 100,058 Illinois Centennial half dollars were struck at the Philadelphia Mint during August 1918, with the excess over the round number reserved for inspection and testing at the 1919 meeting of the annual Assay Commission. There was no official packaging; a few were used in badges for the Illinois Centennial Commission. The coins were not publicized much outside Illinois. The centennial commission distributed them, at face value, to its county affiliates in proportion to their share of Illinois' population, on condition they be sold at a premium to help pay for local celebrations, and if one had already been held, for war relief.

The coins were also sold by the Springfield Chamber of Commerce at $1 each, though some were eventually vended for less: Texas coin dealer B. Max Mehl purchased several thousand at just over face value. A local bank held 30,000 of them for 15 years, and sold them during the 1933 Bank Holiday for a slight advance on par. This temporarily flooded the market, but they were absorbed during the first commemorative coin boom in 1936, though the price did not then rise from the $1.25 they had sold for since about 1925. At the height of the second commemorative coin boom in 1980, uncirculated specimens sold for about $300 (equivalent to $1,172 in 2025). The edition of R. S. Yeoman's A Guide Book of United States Coins published in 2017 lists the coin for between $130 and $685, depending on condition. An exceptional specimen sold at auction in 2014 for $7,040.

== Sources ==
- Bowers, Q. David (1992). Commemorative Coins of the United States: A Complete Encyclopedia. Wolfeboro, New Hampshire: Bowers and Merena Galleries, Inc. ISBN 978-0-943161-35-8.
- Flynn, Kevin (2008). The Authoritative Reference on Commemorative Coins 1892–1954. Roswell, Georgia: Kyle Vick. OCLC 711779330.
- Slabaugh, Arlie R. (1975). United States Commemorative Coinage (second ed.). Racine, Wisconsin: Whitman Publishing. ISBN 978-0-307-09377-6.
- Swiatek, Anthony; Breen, Walter (1981). The Encyclopedia of United States Silver & Gold Commemorative Coins, 1892 to 1954. New York: Arco Publishing. ISBN 978-0-668-04765-4.
- Taxay, Don (1967). An Illustrated History of U.S. Commemorative Coinage. New York: Arco Publishing. ISBN 978-0-668-01536-3.
- United States House of Representatives Committee on Coinage, Weights and Measures (1918). Commission to Standardize Screw Threads. Washington, D.C.: United States Government Printing Office.
- Vermeule, Cornelius (1971). Numismatic Art in America. Cambridge, Massachusetts: The Belknap Press of Harvard University Press. ISBN 978-0-674-62840-3.
- Yeoman, R.S. (2015). A Guide Book of United States Coins (1st Deluxe ed.). Atlanta, Georgia: Whitman Publishing. ISBN 978-0-7948-4307-6.
- Yeoman, R.S. (2017). Bressett, Kenneth (ed.). A Guide Book of United States Coins 2018 (71st ed.). Atlanta, Georgia: Whitman Publishing. ISBN 978-0794845032.
