= Flag and seal of Illinois =

U.S. state flag and seal

State of Illinois
- Use: Civil and state flag
- Proportion: 3:5
- Adopted: July 6, 1915; 111 years ago (initial version) September 17, 1969; 57 years ago (alteration)
- Design: A state seal above the word Illinois in blue on a white field.
- Designed by: Sharon Tyndale
- Use: Variant
- Design: A different design of the state seal above the word Illinois in blue on a white field.

Great Seal of the State of Illinois
- Armiger: State of Illinois
- Adopted: 1868
- Motto: "State Sovereignty, National Union"

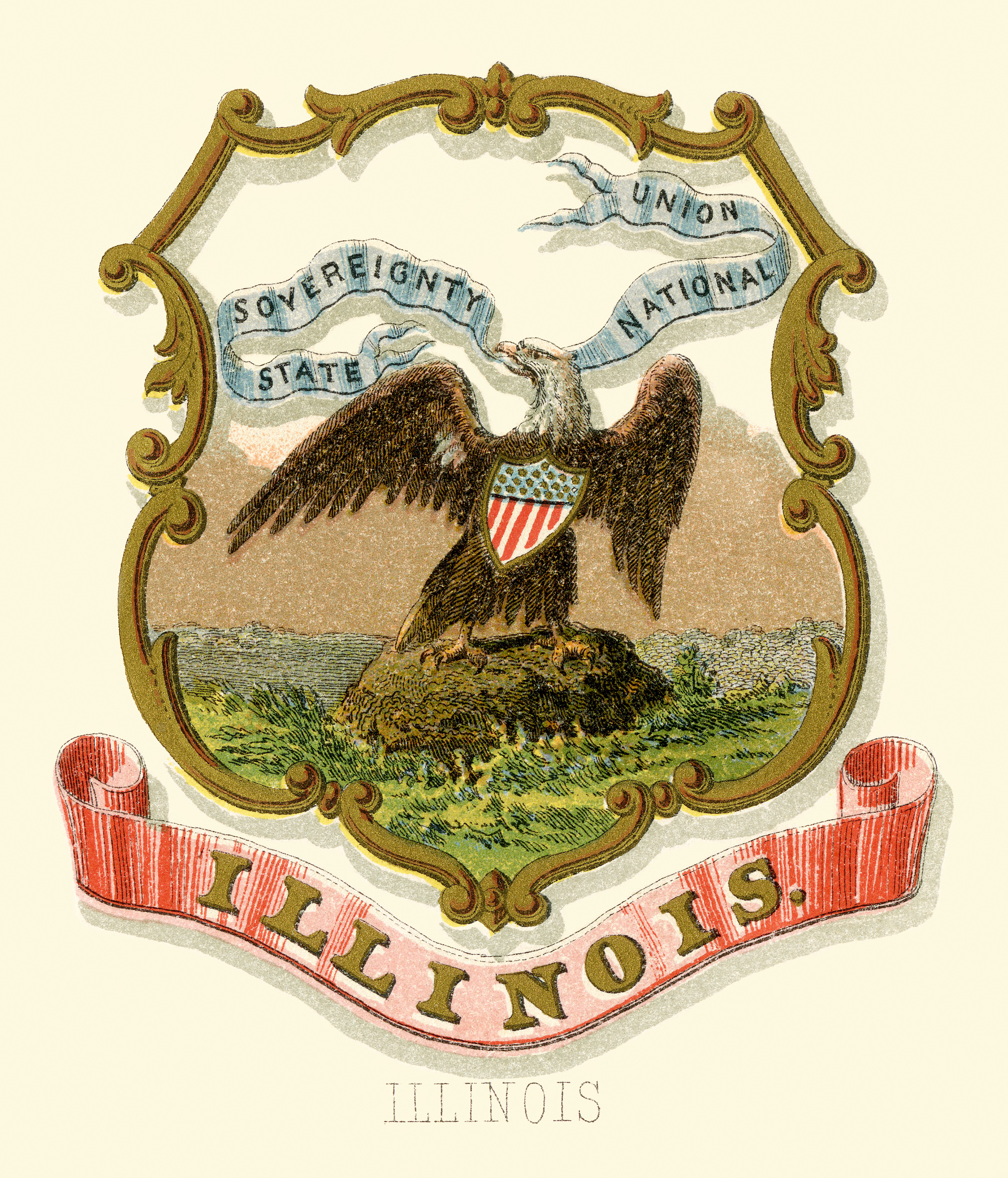
Illinois state historical coat of arms (illustrated, 1876)

The great seal of the state of Illinois is the official emblem of the U.S. state of Illinois, and signifies the official nature of a document produced by the state. The present seal was designed and proposed in 1868 and officially adopted in 1869. It depicts in profile a bald eagle perched on a rock with wings uplifted and holding a shield, with a banner in its beak and sunrise over water in the background. It replaced an earlier seal that was almost the same as the Great Seal of the United States, adopted when Illinois became a state in 1818.

The flag of the state of Illinois bearing the central elements of the seal on a white field was adopted in 1915, and the word Illinois was added to the flag in 1970.

== Design ==
The state flag depicts the Great Seal of Illinois, which was designed in 1819 and emulated the Great Seal of the United States. In the eagle's beak there is a banner with the state motto, "State Sovereignty, National Union." The dates on the seal, 1818 and 1868, represent the year Illinois became a state and the year in which the Great Seal was redesigned by Sharon Tyndale. Although "State Sovereignty" comes first in the motto, "State" is at the bottom and "Sovereignty" is upside-down.

It is one of nine U.S. state flags to feature an eagle, alongside those of Iowa, Michigan, Missouri, New York, North Dakota, Oregon, Pennsylvania, and Wyoming.

== Seal history ==
The first Great Seal of the State of Illinois was adopted in 1819 by the first Illinois General Assembly. The first law authorizing the Great Seal required the secretary of state of Illinois to procure and keep the seal. The first seal engraved was essentially a copy of the Great Seal of the United States. It was used until 1839, when it was recut. The seal designed in 1839 became the Second Great Seal.

Illinois Secretary of State Sharon Tyndale spearheaded the drive to create a third state seal for Illinois. In 1867, he asked State Senator Allen C. Fuller to introduce legislation requiring a new seal, and suggested to Fuller that the words of the state motto be reversed, from "State Sovereignty, National Union", to "National Union, State Sovereignty". However, the bill passed by the legislature on March 7, 1867, kept the original wording. Despite declining his suggestion, the legislature nonetheless entrusted Tyndale with designing the new seal. And Tyndale managed to (literally) twist the legislature's intent; he kept the words in the correct order on the banner, but the banner twists, so the word "Sovereignty" is upside down, arguably making it less readable.

Tyndale's seal features a bald eagle perched on a rock carrying a shield in its talons and a banner with the state motto in its beak. Thirteen stars and thirteen stripes on the shield represent the original thirteen states of the Union. The date August 26, 1818, when Illinois's first constitution was adopted in Kaskaskia, appears along the bottom arc of the circle, and 1818, the year of statehood, displays on the seal below 1868, the year the current seal was adopted. This basic design has survived through several minor modifications since it was first conceived. The Illinois secretary of state is still the keeper of the Great Seal of the State of Illinois.

== Flag statute ==
The 2024 Illinois Compiled Statutes, 5 ILCS 460/5 defines that the flag shall consist of:

"the reproduction of the emblem only on the 'great seal of the State of Illinois' … reproduced in black or in the national colors upon a white sheet or background and bearing underneath the emblem in blue letters the word 'Illinois,' and being an actual reproduction of the great seal, except for the outer ring, for use as a State banner"

== Flag history ==
=== Initial adoption, 1915 ===
Illinois's flag from 1915 to 1968

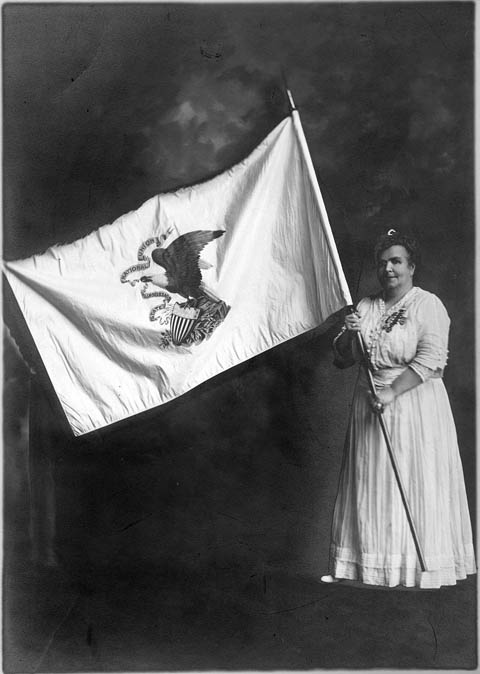
Ella Park Lawrence holds the original Illinois state flag, c. 1915.

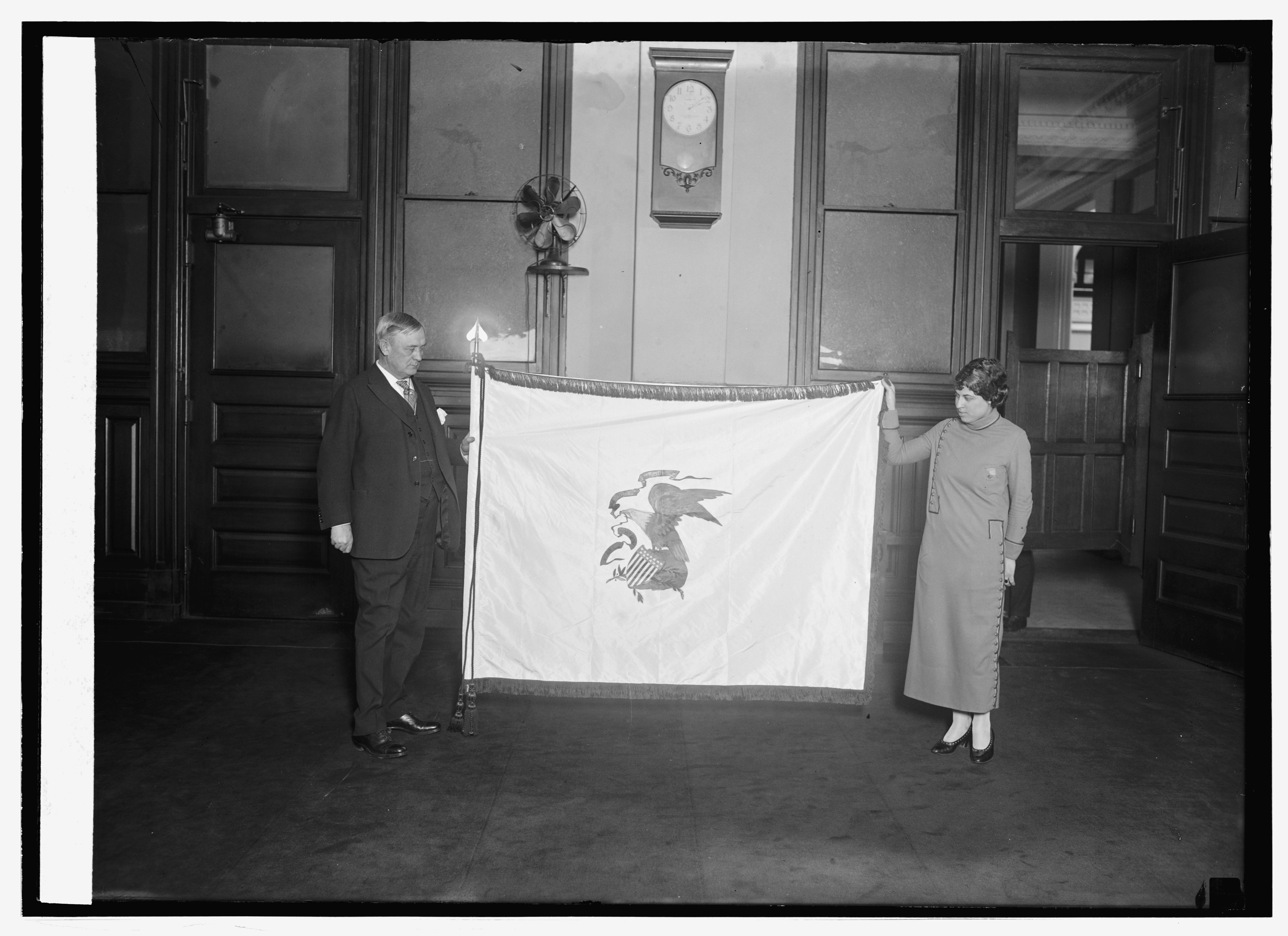
Presentation of the state flag, February 26, 1924.

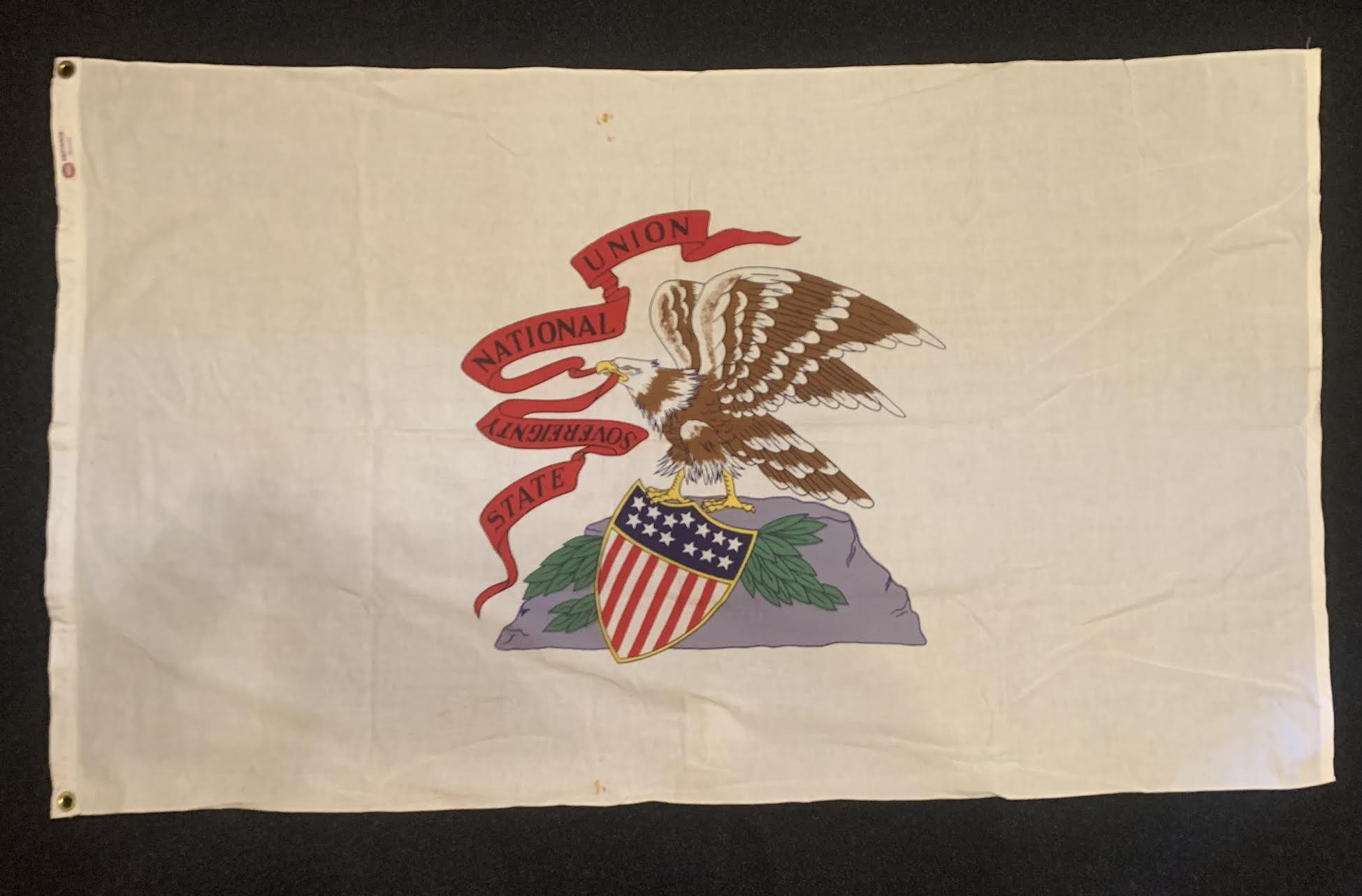
Older state flag featuring the eagle on a larger rock

=== Unofficial flags (before-1915) ===
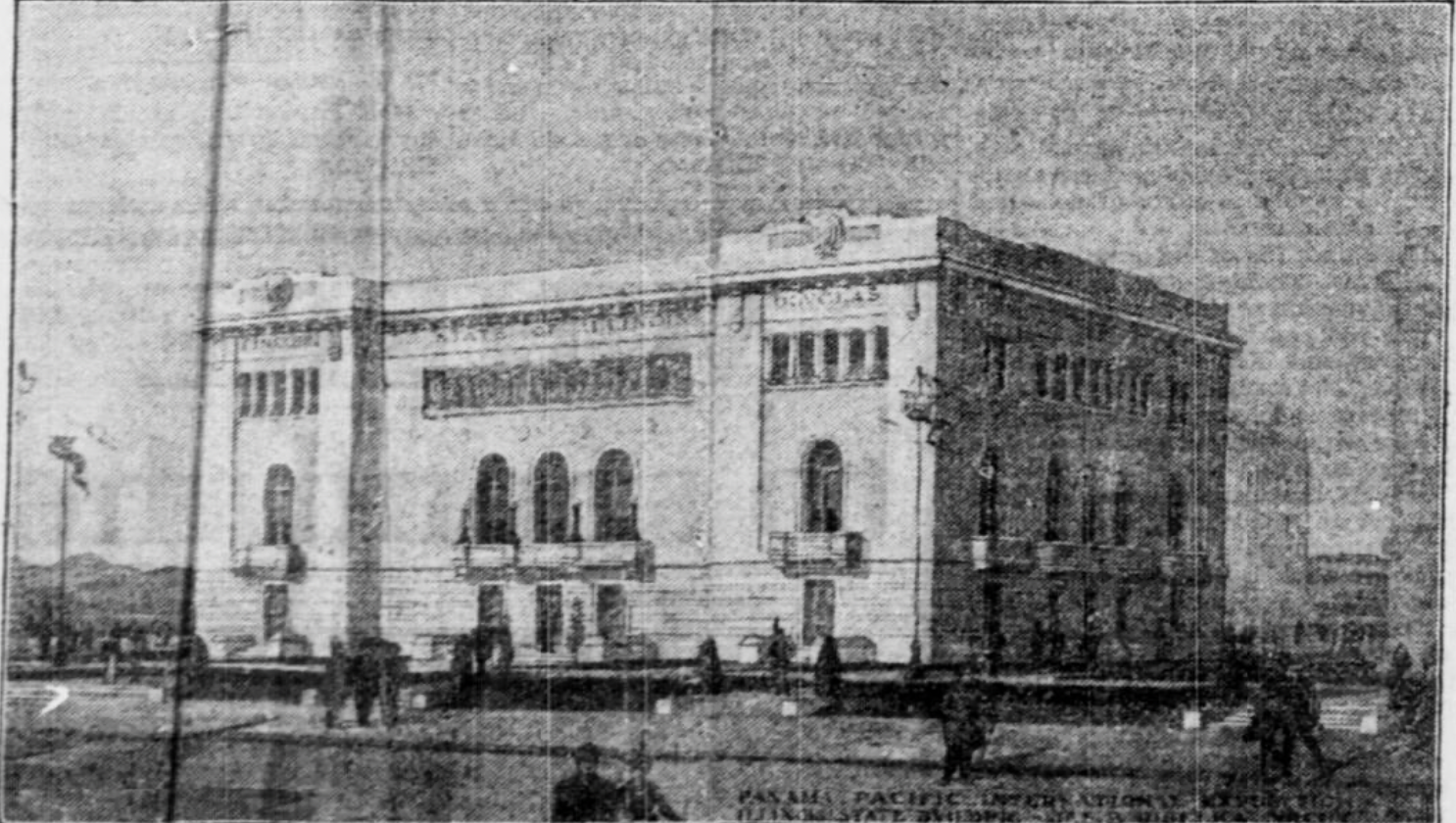
Illinois building from the Panama-Pacific International Exposition, 1914

In 1884, a banner bearing the state's coat of arms was displayed in Washington, D.C.

The first state flag was made in 1885 and featured a red field with the coat of arms in gold. The flag made its last appearance on May 30, 1905 when one of Governor Charles Deneen's sons found it the attic of the Governor's Mansion. He raised it over the home but it was soon taken down.

In 1914, Mrs. L. E. Rockwell flew a state flag over the Illinois building for the Panama-Pacific International Exposition, its design is unknown.

=== Official flag (after 1915) ===
During her time as state regent of the Daughters of the American Revolution (DAR) in 1912, Ella Park Lawrence began a campaign to have Illinois adopt a state flag. She was unsuccessful during her time as state regent, but continued to lobby members of the Illinois General Assembly to adopt a state flag as a member of the Rockford chapter of the DAR. On April 1, 1914, Lawrence sent a letter to every Illinois chapter of the DAR announcing a contest to design an Illinois state flag, with the winner receiving a prize of $25, equivalent to $804 in 2025. Thirty-five designs were submitted in response to this contest. One of the proposed designs was made by Miss Lucy Derwent of Rockford. It was described as having a blue field with a white circle in the middle bearing the state coat of arms with sliver fringe around it.

The contest was judged by a panel chaired by Lewis Stevenson, Illinois Secretary of State. They selected the design of Lucy Derwent. The flag became the official state banner on July 6, 1915, following its passage in the Illinois State House and Senate. Governor Edward F. Dunne did not sign the bill, but he did not veto it.

=== 1969 alterations ===
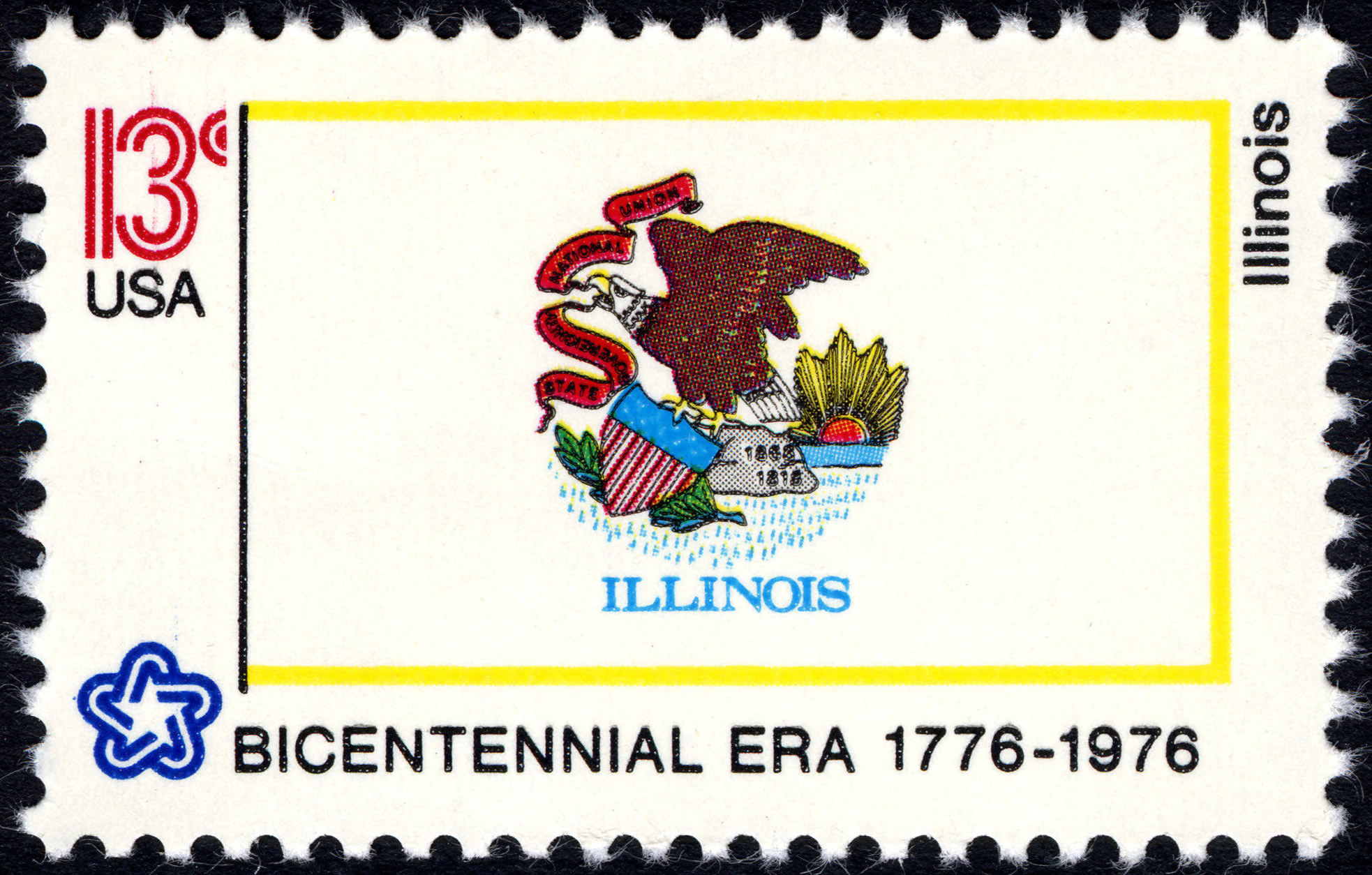
The Illinois state flag as depicted in the 1976 bicentennial postage stamp series.

In the 1960s, Chief Petty Officer Bruce McDaniel petitioned to have the name of the state added to the flag. He noted that many of the people with whom he served during the Vietnam War did not recognize the banner. Governor Richard B. Ogilvie signed the addition to the flag into law on September 17, 1969, and the new flag, designed by Sanford (Florence) Hutchinson, became official on July 1, 1970.

=== 2025 redesign contest ===
In March 2023, the Illinois Senate approved the creation of the Illinois Flag Commission, tasked with exploring and developing a new design for the state flag. By May 2023, the Illinois House passed the same bill. Lawmakers stated that the General Assembly could decide on the new flag within the coming years. In August 2024, it was announced that a contest to redesign the flag would begin, with submissions opening on September 3, 2024 and closing on October 18, 2024. The Commission selected ten designs, which were published on December 10 and put to an online public vote in January and February 2025. In addition to the new designs, the public also had the option to vote for three historic Illinois flags—the Centennial flag, the Sesquicentennial flag, and the current state flag. The state's General Assembly will make the final decision regardless of the voting results.

On March 6, 2025, the Illinois Secretary of State Alexi Giannoulias announced on social media the results of the flag vote. The current flag received 43% of the votes (165,602 votes), while 57% of the votes were distributed among the remaining 12 designs, none of which exceeded 10%. Giannoulias commented: "Some may call it an SOB—a seal on a bedsheet—and the vexillological community may hate it, but people overwhelmingly prefer our current state flag." These results will be sent to the Illinois General Assembly, and they will make the final decision.

Outcome of the flag vote
Submission number	Flag in use	#2246 (Note: Designed by Scott Clanin and Colleen Hayes)	#3679	#896 (Note: Designed by Dean Thomas)	#4129	#4220	#4321 (Note: Designed by Spresalynn Tipps and Johna Kinney)
Flags						Submission#4220	Submission#4220
Number of Votes	165,602	32,898	29,476	26,559	25,653	21,981	18,574
Vote %	43.14%	8.57%	7.68%	6.92%	6.68%	5.73%	4.84%
Submission number	#2752	Centennial Flag	#4669	#200	#3754	Sesquicentennial Flag	
Flags							
Number of Votes	15,739	15,159	10,113	9,840	7,169	5,096	
Vote %	4.10%	3.95%	2.63%	2.56%	1.87%	1.33%	

== Anniversary flags ==
Illinois Statehood flag, 1818

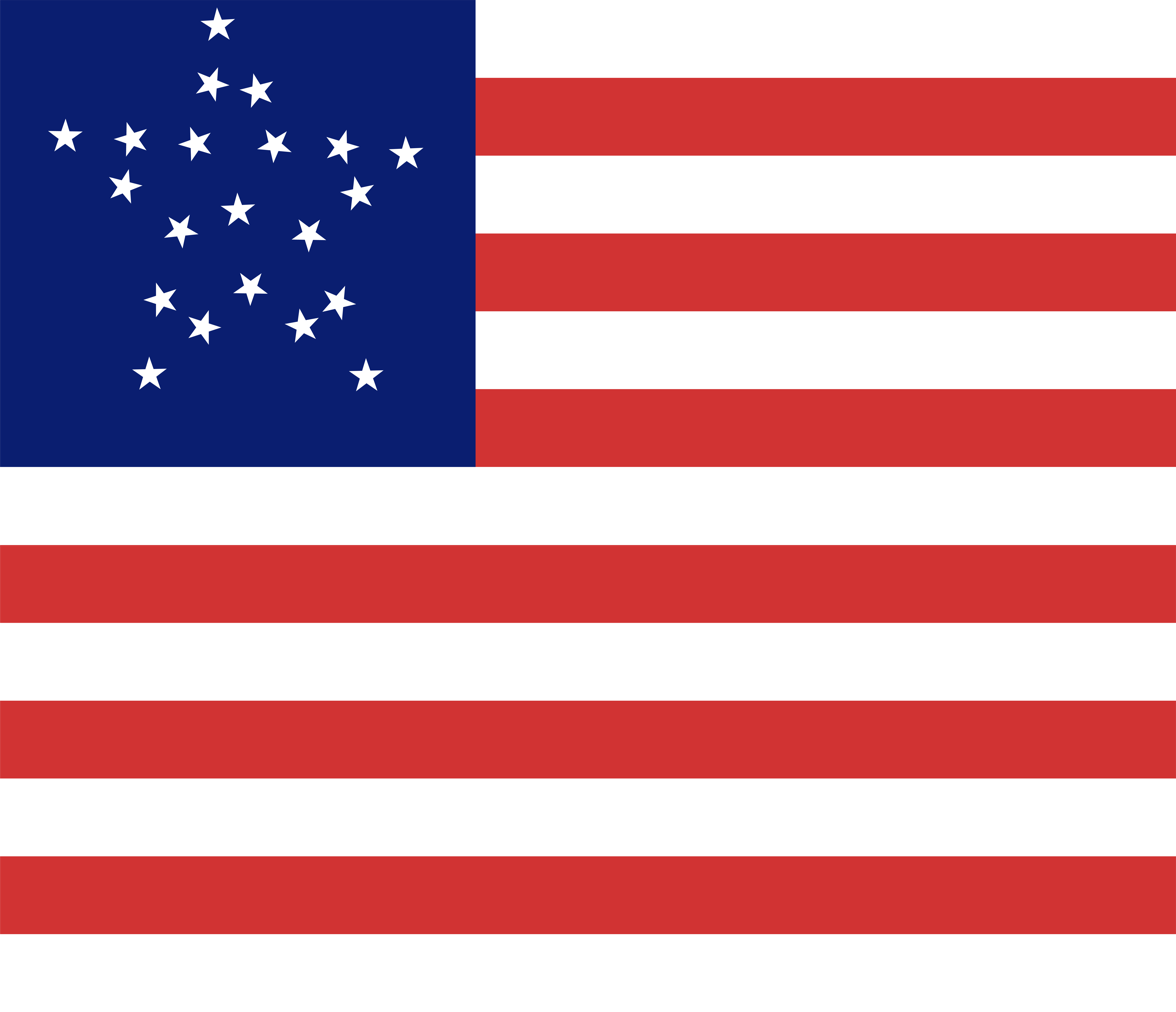
Another flag flown to celebrate Statehood, 1818

=== Illinois Centennial design ===
Illinois Centennial flag by Wallace Rice

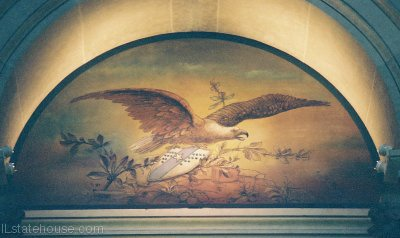
In 1918 Springfield artist George H. Schanbacher painted the eagles and shields between the corbel statues in the upper rotunda as part of Illinois' centennial celebration. This shield was modeled after the centennial flag designed by Wallace Rice.

For Illinois's first 100 years of statehood in 1918, Wallace Rice, who designed Chicago's flag, designed a centennial flag for the state. It had three horizontal bands of equal width alternating white, blue, white. It was charged with 21 stars along the edge of the hoist. There were 10 blue stars in the upper white band and 10 in the lower white band, representing the 10 northern and 10 southern states at the time of Illinois' statehood in 1818. The center blue band had one large, white star for the state of Illinois itself.

=== Illinois Sesquicentennial design ===
Illinois Sesquicentennial flag

To mark Illinois' 150th anniversary of statehood in 1968, a sesquicentennial flag was designed for the state. The flag was dark blue, with a stylised white letter "I" defaced with a red map of Illinois in the center, which was surrounded by a circle of twenty white five-pointed stars, with an additional twenty-first star (larger than the others) set outside the circle to the upper-right.

=== Illinois Bicentennial design ===
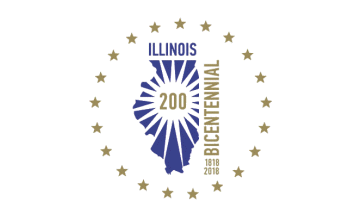
Illinois Bicentennial flag

There was no bicentennial flag. However, on January 12, 2017, the state unveiled a logo in preparation for the state's bicentennial the following year. The logo, designed by Ben Olsen, features a blue silhouette of the state with the word ILLINOIS above. In the center of the silhouette, is a sunburst effect with the number 200 in gold. Along the right side is the word Bicentennial also in gold from bottom to top and beneath are the dates 1818 and 2018. This is all surrounded by 21 gold stars denoting Illinois position as the twenty-first state. Executive Director of the Bicentennial Office, Stewart Layne, added, "The sunburst in the middle of the state outline portrays the impact Illinois has made on the country and the world over the past two centuries and the bright future we aspire to for the next 200 years." The "Illinois Bicentennial Flag Raising Ceremony" took place on December 4, 2017 at the Skokie Village Hall in Cook County.

== Government seals of Illinois ==
Seal of the attorney general of Illinois

Seal of the Illinois Department of Financial and Professional Regulation

Seal of the Illinois State Toll Highway Authority

== See also ==
- Illinois Centennial half dollar
- Symbols of Illinois
