= List of United States commemorative coins before 1900 =

The United States has struck commemorative coins since 1848 to commemorate the anniversaries of people, places, and events. Commemorative coins have a face value and are legal tender, though they are sold at premium as souvenirs. The classic era of commemorative coins began in 1892 with the issuance of the Columbian Exposition half dollar. This list includes the major varieties of United States commemorative coins struck before 1900.

William L. Marcy in 1848 requested that Mint Director Robert Patterson stamp "CAL." on gold coins struck from gold sent from California. The coins have been described by several numismatists as the first United States commemorative coins. Alternatively, the 1892 Columbian Exposition half dollar has been described as the first United States commemorative coins.

== Commemorative coins ==
(P)	No mint mark, struck at the Philadelphia Mint

Commemorative coins issued by the United States before 1900
Coin	Year(s)	Obverse design	Reverse design	Designer	Composition	Mintage (mint)	Obverse	Reverse	Ref.
CAL. Liberty quarter eagle	1848	Head of Liberty	Eagle with "CAL." punched into the field	Christian Gobrecht	90% gold, 10% copper	1,389 (P)			
Columbian half dollar	1892	Portrait of Christopher Columbus	The Santa María above two globes	Charles E. Barber (obverse) and George T. Morgan (reverse), based on models by Olin Levi Warner	90% silver, 10% copper	950,000 (P)			
Isabella quarter	1893	Portrait of Isabella I of Castile	Kneeling woman with distaff and spindle	Charles E. Barber	90% silver, 10% copper	40,023 (Note: 15,809 coins were melted. 23 coins were for assay.) (P)			
Columbian half dollar	1893	Portrait of Christopher Columbus	The Santa María above two globes	Charles E. Barber (obverse) and George T. Morgan (reverse), based on models by Olin Levi Warner	90% silver, 10% copper	4,052,105 (Note: 2,501,700 coins were melted. 2,105 coins were for assay.) (P)			
Lafayette dollar	1899 (dated 1900)	Portraits of George Washington and Lafayette	Equestrian statue of Lafayette	Charles E. Barber	90% silver, 10% copper	50,026 (Note: 14,000 coins were melted. 26 coins were for assay.) (P)			
