= List of United States commemorative coins (1900s) =

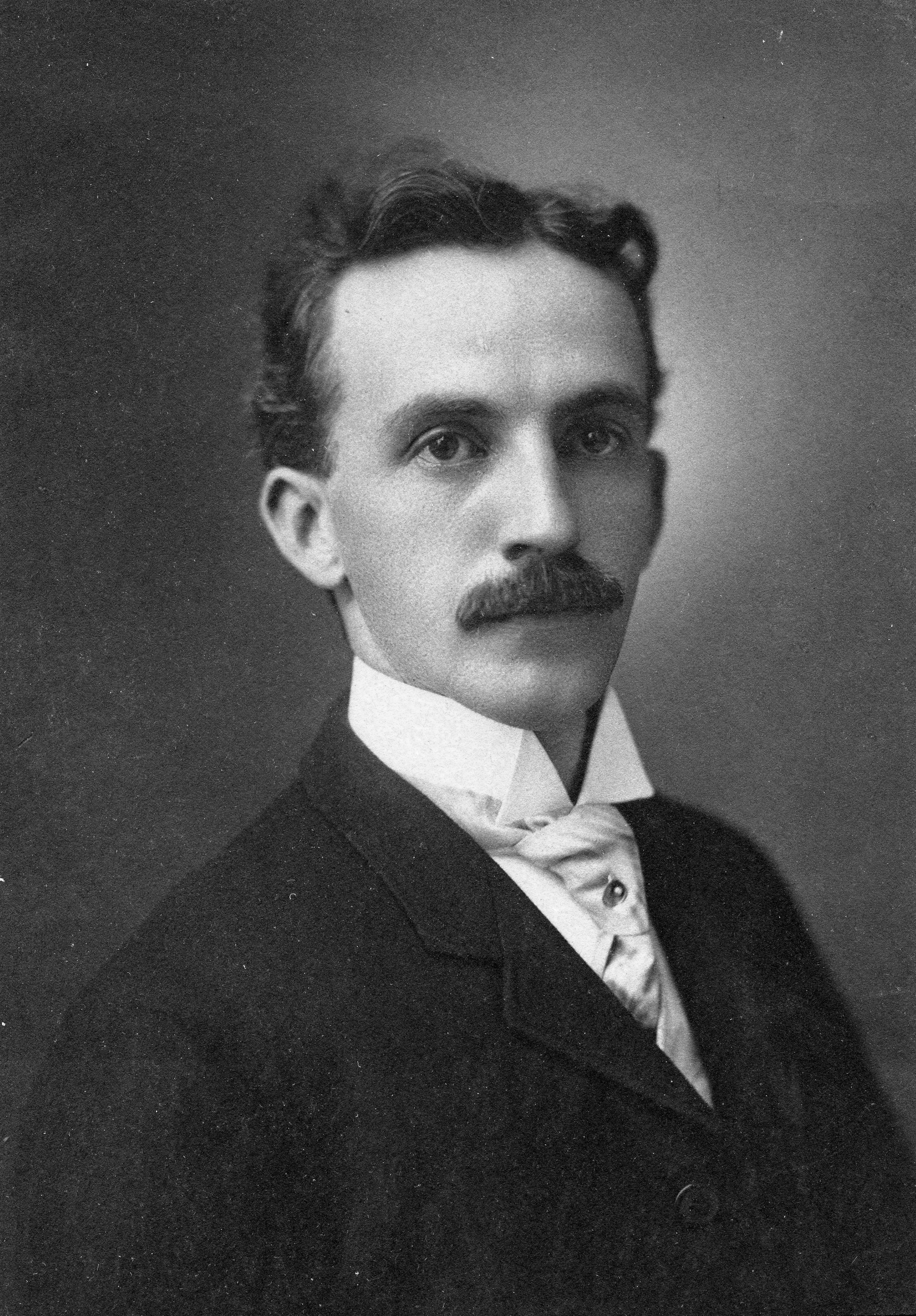
Farran Zerbe

The United States has struck commemorative coins since 1848 to commemorate the anniversaries of people, places, and events. Commemorative coins have a face value and are legal tender, though they are sold at premium as souvenirs. Most commemorative coins are sold to coin collectors. The classic era of commemorative coins began in 1892 with the issuance of the Columbian Exposition half dollar. This list includes the major varieties of United States commemorative coins struck in the 1900s.

The decade saw the issue of gold dollars for the Louisiana Purchase Exposition and the Lewis and Clark Centennial Exposition. Numismatist and coin dealer Farran Zerbe promoted and handled distribution of the coins for both events. Numismatic author Q. David Bowers described Zerbe's handling and distribution of the Louisiana Purchase Exposition gold dollars as "setting a precedent that would [...] lead to abuses."

== Commemorative coins ==
(P)	No mint mark, struck at the Philadelphia Mint

Commemorative coins issued by the United States in the 1900s
Coin	Year(s)	Obverse design	Reverse design	Designer	Composition	Mintage (mint)	Obverse	Reverse	Ref.
Louisiana Purchase Jefferson dollar	1903	Portrait of Thomas Jefferson, copied from a medal by John Reich	Branch and inscription	Charles E. Barber, assisted by George T. Morgan	90% gold, 10% copper	125,000 (Note: 215,250 of both types were coins were melted. 258 coins of both types were struck for assay.) (P)			
Louisiana Purchase McKinley dollar	1903	Portrait of William McKinley	Branch and inscription	Charles E. Barber	90% gold, 10% copper	125,000 (P)			
Lewis and Clark Exposition dollar	1904	Portrait of Meriwether Lewis	Portrait of William Clark	Charles E. Barber	90% gold, 10% copper	25,028 (Note: 15,003 coins were melted. 28 coins were for assay.) (P)			
Lewis and Clark Exposition dollar	1905	Portrait of Meriwether Lewis	Portrait of William Clark	Charles E. Barber	90% gold, 10% copper	35,041 (Note: 25,000 coins were melted. 41 coins were for assay.) (P)			
