= List of United States commemorative coins (1940s) =

== 1946 ==
=== Non-circulating coins ===
Face value	Coin	Obverse design	Reverse design	Composition	Mintage	Available	Obverse	Reverse
50¢	Iowa Centennial half dollar	Old Stone Capitol	Eagle	90% Ag, 10% Cu	Authorized: 100,000 (max) Uncirculated: 100,057 (P)	1946, 1996, 2046		
50¢	Booker T. Washington Memorial half dollar	Booker T. Washington	Hall of Fame for Great Americans and a log cabin	90% Ag, 10% Cu	Authorized: 5,000,000 (max 1946–1951 total) Uncirculated: 1,000,546 (P); 200,113 D 500,279 S	1946		

== 1947 ==
=== Non-circulating coins ===
Face value	Coin	Obverse design	Reverse design	Composition	Mintage	Available	Obverse	Reverse
50¢	Booker T. Washington Memorial half dollar	Booker T. Washington	Hall of Fame for Great Americans and a log cabin	90% Ag, 10% Cu	Uncirculated: 100,017 (P); 100,017 D 100,017 S	1947		
50¢	Wisconsin Statehood half dollar (vetoed)	Unknown	Unknown	90% Ag, 10% Cu	None authorized or minted	Never available		

== 1948 ==
=== Non-circulating coins ===
Face value	Coin	Obverse design	Reverse design	Composition	Mintage	Available	Obverse	Reverse
50¢	Booker T. Washington Memorial half dollar	Booker T. Washington	Hall of Fame for Great Americans and a log cabin	90% Ag, 10% Cu	Uncirculated: 12,004 (P); 12,004 D 12,004 S	1948		
50¢	Minnesota Territorial Centennial half dollar (cancelled)	Unknown	Unknown	90% Ag, 10% Cu	None authorized or minted	Never available		

== 1949 ==
=== Non-circulating coins ===
Face value	Coin	Obverse design	Reverse design	Composition	Mintage	Available	Obverse	Reverse
50¢	Booker T. Washington Memorial half dollar	Booker T. Washington	Hall of Fame for Great Americans and a log cabin	90% Ag, 10% Cu	Uncirculated: 12,004 (P); 12,004 D 12,004 S	1949		
