= List of United States commemorative coins (1970s) =

== 1976 ==
=== Circulating coins ===
Face value	Coin	Obverse design	Reverse design	Mintage	Obverse	Reverse
25¢	United States Bicentennial quarter	George Washington	Drummer boy	Circulation: 809,784,016 (P); 860,118,839 D Uncirculated: 3,814,001 (P) (clad); 3,814,001 D (clad); 4,908,319 S (silver) Proof: 3-4 (P) (silver); 7,059,099 S (clad); 3,998,621 S (silver)		
50¢	United States Bicentennial half dollar	John F. Kennedy	Independence Hall	Circulation: 234,308,000 (P); 287,565,248 D Uncirculated: 3,814,001 (P) (clad); 3,814,001 D (clad); 4,908,319 S (silver) Proof: 3-4 (P) (silver); 7,059,099 S (clad); 3,998,621 S (silver)		
$1	United States Bicentennial dollar	Dwight D. Eisenhower	Liberty Bell and the Moon	Circulation: 25,067,710 (P); 103,228,274 D Uncirculated: 3,814,001 (P) (clad); 3,814,001 D (clad); 4,908,319 S (silver) Proof: 4-5 (P) (silver); 7,059,099 S (clad); 3,998,621 S (silver)		
