= Panama–Pacific commemorative coins =

Series of five commemorative coins of the United States

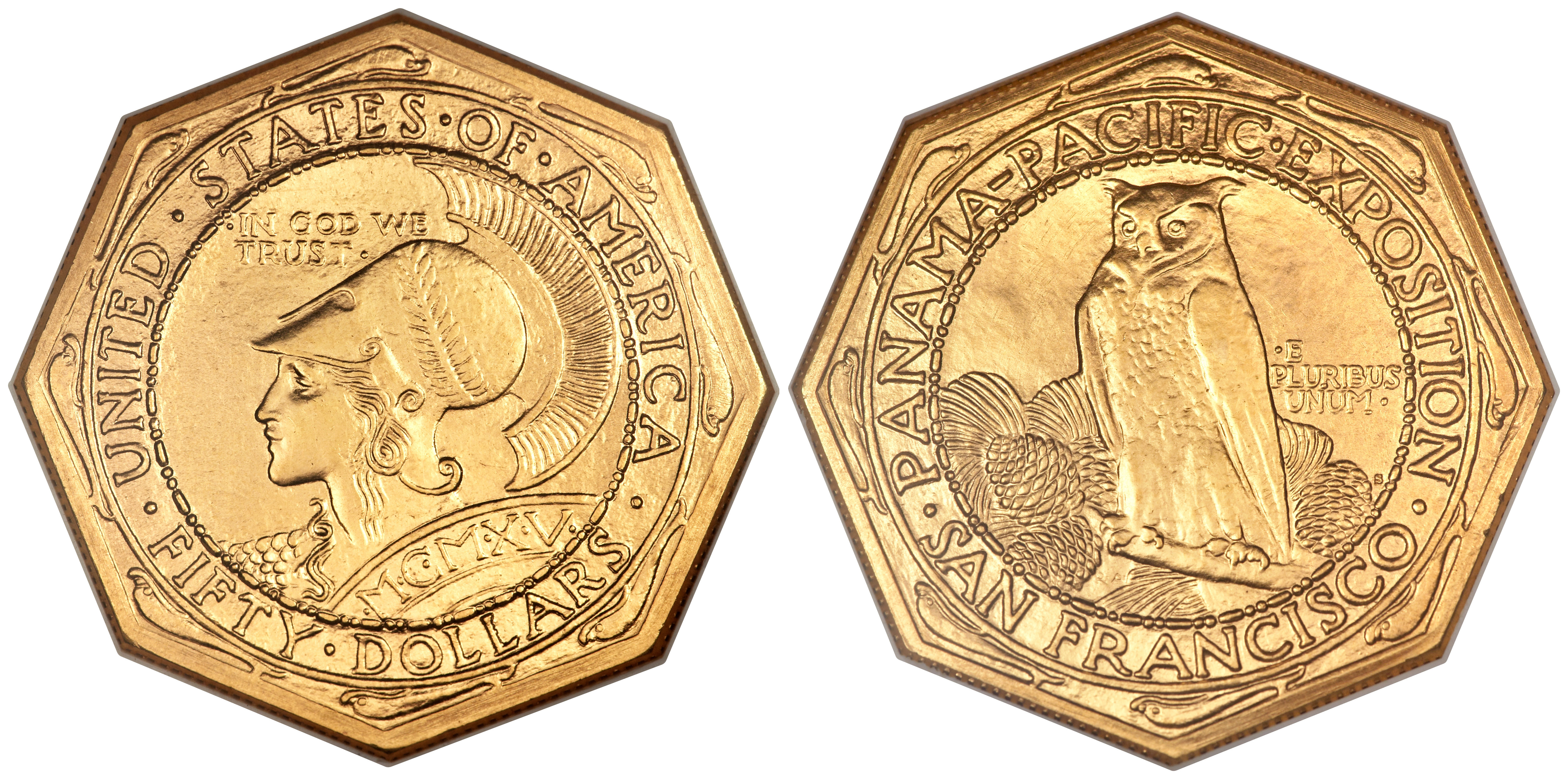
Robert Ingersoll Aitken's octagonal $50 piece

The five Panama–Pacific commemorative coins were produced in connection with the 1915 Panama–Pacific International Exposition in San Francisco. Struck at that city's mint, the issue included round and octagonal $50 pieces. Excepting modern bullion coins, these two gold pieces are the highest denomination ever issued and the largest coins ever struck by the United States Mint. The octagonal $50 piece is the only U.S. coin to be issued that is not round.

In January 1915, Congress passed legislation for a silver half dollar, as well as a gold dollar, quarter eagle ($2.50 piece), and two $50 pieces: one round and one octagonal. The Mint had already consulted artists. Treasury Secretary William G. McAdoo initially rejected all their designs. Two of them, Robert Ingersoll Aitken for the $50 pieces and Charles Keck for the gold dollar, persevered, and their submissions were used. The half dollar and quarter eagle were designed by Chief Engraver Charles E. Barber, possibly with the participation of his longtime assistant, George T. Morgan.

The coins were vended at the Exposition by prominent numismatist Farran Zerbe. They did not sell well, and many of each denomination were returned for melting. Only a few hundred of each of the $50 pieces were distributed, making them the lowest-mintage commemorative coins. They catalog for up to $200,000, depending on condition.

== Background ==
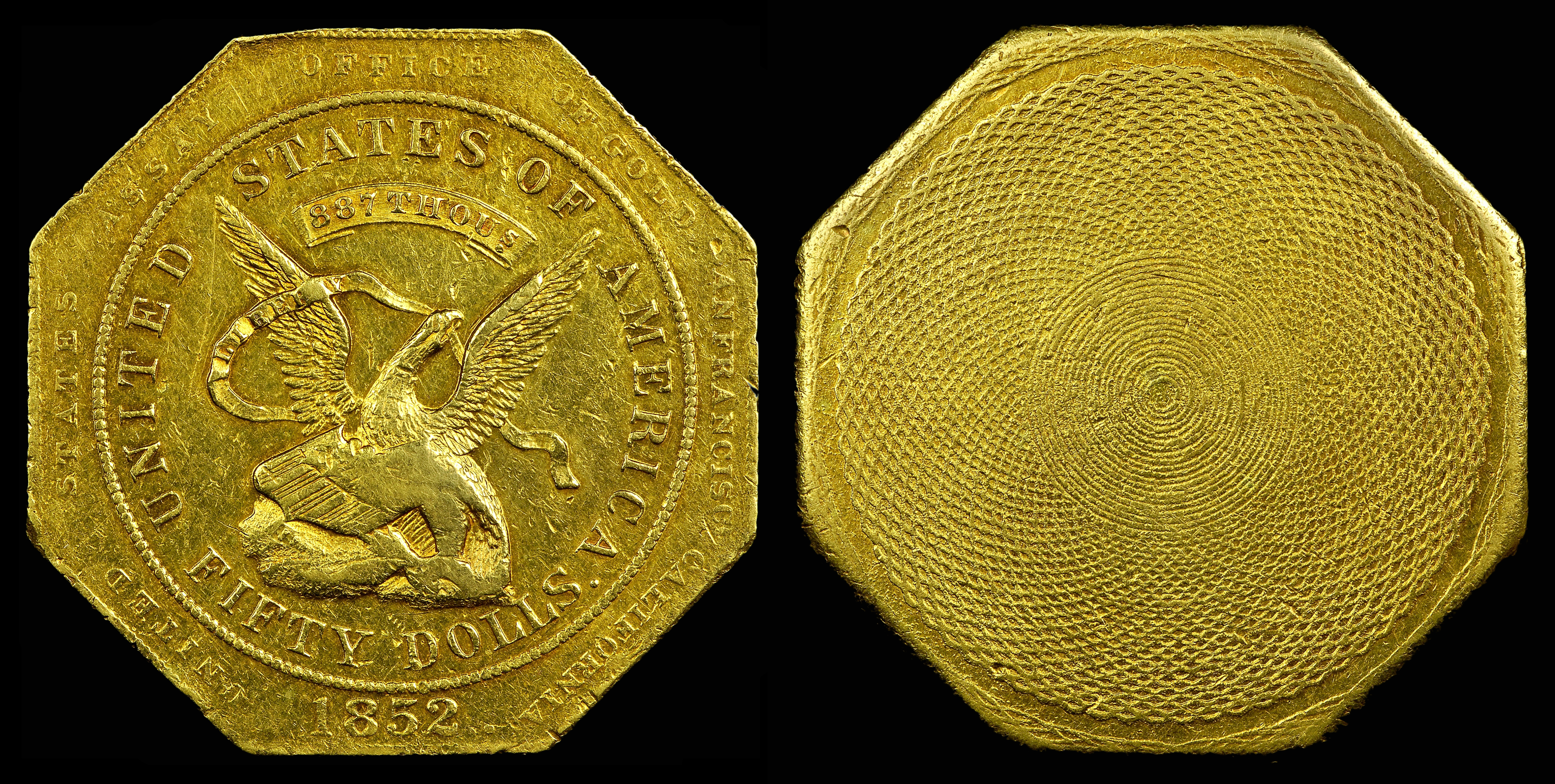
$50 "slug" produced by Augustus Humbert for the San Francisco Assay Office

Private gold pieces, sometimes dubbed "pioneer gold", were struck several times during the 19th century from locally produced bullion in areas where federal coins were scarce. These unofficial coins came from sites ranging from Georgia to Oregon. Many, ranging in denomination from 25 cents to 50 dollars, are relics of the California Gold Rush and its aftermath. The fifty-dollar denomination was struck by private minters such as Kellogg and Co. The private $50 pieces were round in form, but those struck by Augustus Humbert for the U.S. Assay Office at San Francisco, prior to the establishment of the San Francisco Mint in 1854, were octagonal. Humbert's pieces were not money in a legal sense, as Congress had not authorized them as legal tender, and were officially deemed ingots. Nevertheless, they contained their full value in gold. Bearing the denomination "Fifty Dollars", they were called "slugs" or "quintuple eagles" by the public. They circulated widely in California and elsewhere in the Far West, and were accepted on par with federal gold coins.

All of these $50 pieces, public or private, are very rare and valuable today: One of Humbert's octagonal pieces, dated 1851 and with a lettered edge, sold at auction in 2010 for $546,250. The only $50 piece produced by the United States Bureau of the Mint prior to 1915 was the 1877 pattern half union, produced experimentally at the Philadelphia Mint, though it was not approved as a circulating coin.

In 1904, San Francisco merchant Rueben Hale proposed an exposition in his home city for 1915, both to commemorate the opening of the Panama Canal and to mark the 400th anniversary of Vasco Núñez de Balboa becoming the first European known to view the Pacific Ocean from the Americas: in phrasing then current, he discovered the Pacific. Although the 1906 San Francisco earthquake and fire caused a momentary setback to these plans, it actually sparked additional fundraising. Many of the wealthiest in California gave financial support, the state matched private donations dollar for dollar, and in 1911, President William Howard Taft selected San Francisco over its competitor, New Orleans, to host the fair.

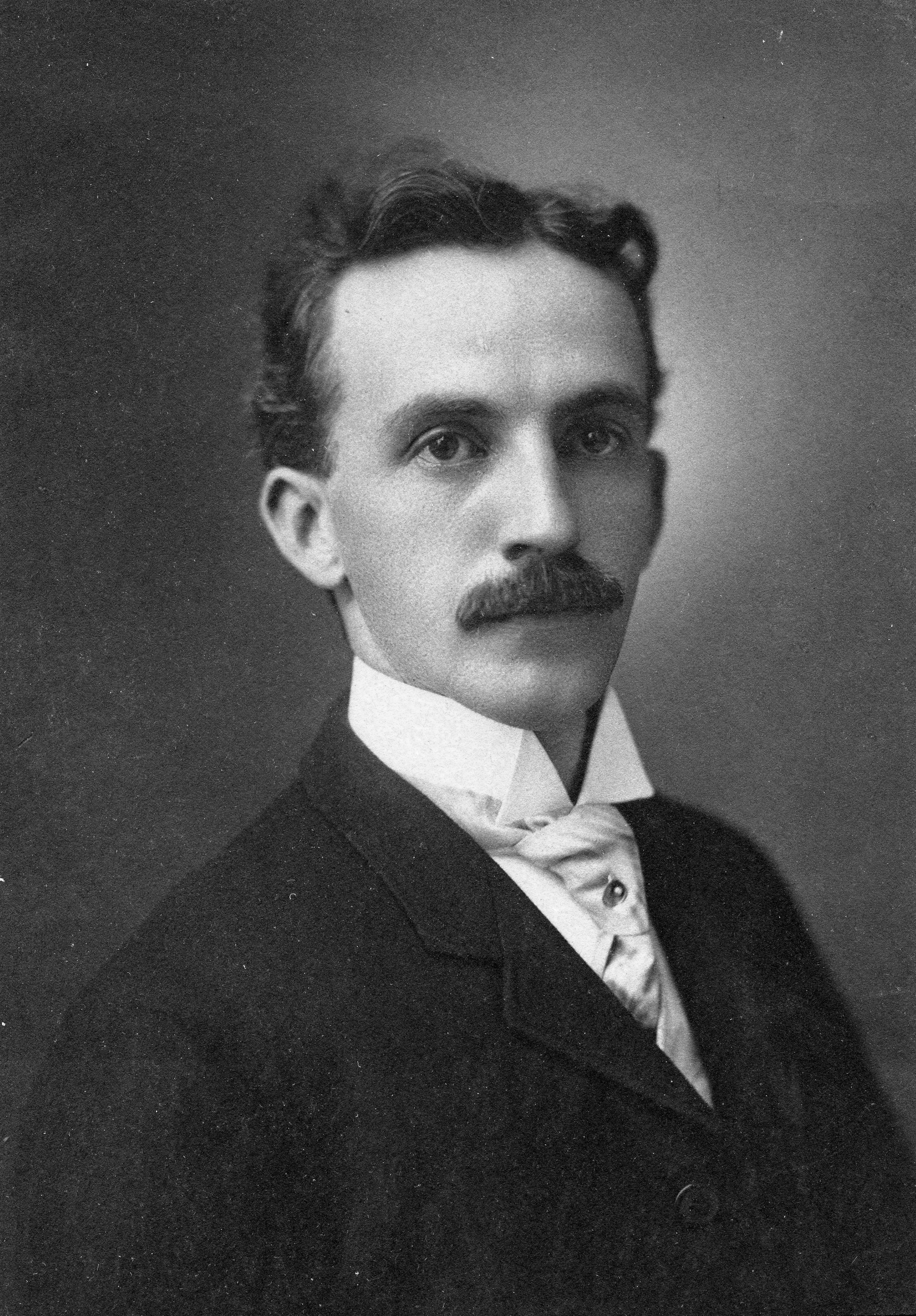
Numismatist Farran Zerbe

The Panama–Pacific International Exposition, constructed in San Francisco by the Golden Gate at a cost of $50 million, was open from February 20, 1915, to December 4, 1915. About 19,000,000 people attended, and the exposition was a great success, generating enough profit to build the San Francisco Civic Auditorium with about $1 million remaining. The Palace of Fine Arts is the only building from the fair which remains on the site.

Commemorative coins were not then sold to the public by the Mint, as they subsequently have been. Instead, a commemorative's authorizing legislation would designate a group or organization to purchase the coins from the Mint at face value, and sell them to the public as a fundraiser. Among those who had pushed for commemorative legislation in the past, and had been involved in the sale of the resulting coins, was Farran Zerbe, a collector and numismatic promoter who had by 1914 served as president of the American Numismatic Association. Zerbe was a controversial figure—some felt the coins with which he had been involved had been sold at inflated prices—but he helped promote the hobby with his exhibit, "Money of the World", which later became part of the Chase Manhattan Money Museum.

== Legislation ==
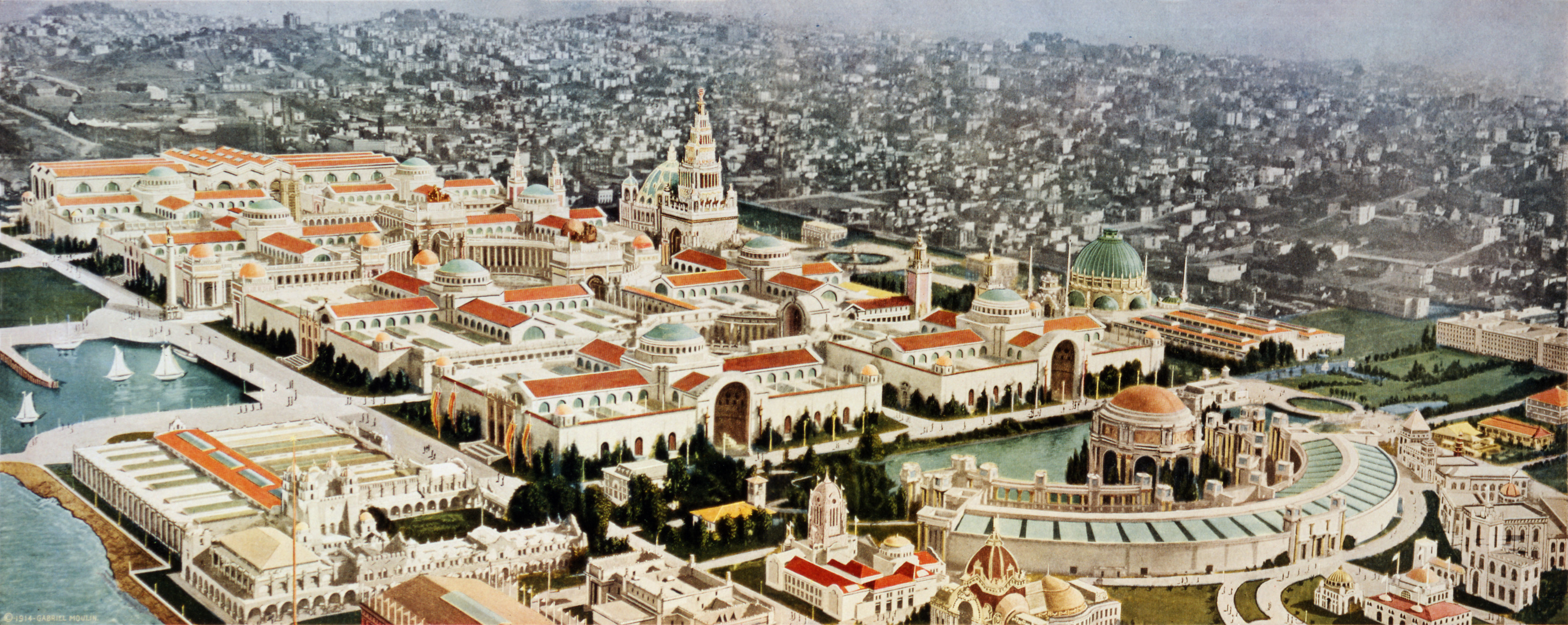
Aerial view of the Panama–Pacific International Exposition

Several proposals for commemorative coins had been introduced by mid-1914, though none had been issued by the Mint since 1905. One, sponsored by New York Senator Elihu Root, called for a commemorative quarter dollar marking a century of peace, as well as the August 1914 opening of the Panama Canal. Two bills were introduced calling for coins to commemorate and benefit the Panama–Pacific Exposition; H.R. 16902 was introduced by California Congressman Julius Kahn on June 3, 1914. Senate bill (S.) 6309 was introduced in that body by New Jersey Senator James E. Martine on July 6. This bill called for two $50 pieces (one round, one octagonal), a quarter eagle or $2.50 in gold, a commemorative gold dollar, and a half dollar. The octagonal pieces were intended to recall the unofficial $50 coins struck during the Gold Rush

Martine's bill passed the Senate on August 3, having been approved by the Committee on Industrial Expositions, to which it had been referred. The only objection was procedural, by Utah's Reed Smoot: that the bill should have instead been referred to and approved by the Senate Committee on Banking and Currency, or its Committee on Finance. Neither Smoot nor any other senator objected to the bill itself, which Martine indicated had the support of Treasury Secretary William G. McAdoo. S. 6309 was the following day sent to the House of Representatives, where it was referred to the Committee on Coinage, Weights and Measures. It emerged from that committee on September 1, 1914, with several amendments, one of which increased the combined authorized mintage of the two $50 pieces from 2,000 to 3,000. S. 6309 was briefly considered by the House of Representatives on January 4, 1915, and passed after Kahn successfully proposed a minor amendment to strike out the dollar sign from the phrase "silver coins of the denomination of $50 cents each". The Senate concurred in the House amendments two days later, passing the bill without question, change, or opposition, and President Woodrow Wilson signed it into law on January 16.

== Preparation ==
Once Kahn's bill was introduced in the House, Mint Director George E. Roberts began to make informal arrangements to prepare for the commemorative issue. The bill called for four different designs (the two $50 pieces would differ mainly in shape), plus a commemorative medal to be sold to fairgoers, with an award medal to be given to prizewinning exhibitors. All of these pieces were to be struck by the Bureau of the Mint, and Roberts asked the Commission of Fine Arts to recommend artists. Among those recommended were Adolph A. Weinman (who would design the Mercury dime and Walking Liberty half dollar in 1916), and Bela L. Pratt (creator of the 1908 Indian Head gold pieces). Others included sculptors Evelyn Beatrice Longman, Robert I. Aitken, Charles Keck, and Paul Manship.

Roberts wrote to several of the sculptors, and found Aitken interested in creating the $50 pieces. The Mint Director's tentative negotiations with Aitken for the large gold coins and with Buffalo nickel designer James Earl Fraser for the award medal ended when Roberts resigned in November to take a banking job; McAdoo appointed Dr. Frederic Dewey as Acting Director of the Mint. Dewey and McAdoo did little regarding the Panama–Pacific coins until Congress began to pass the authorizing legislation in early January 1915. Once it had passed both houses, and was awaiting Wilson's signature, Dewey arranged for a meeting in New York with Aitken, Keck, Longman, and Manship. The authorizing act required the Mint to begin delivering coins by the opening date of the fair, February 20, 1915, and although this proved impractical, the Mint still acted quickly. McAdoo approved the choices of Aitken for the $50 pieces, Longman for the quarter eagle, Keck for the dollar, and Manship for the half dollar on January 21. All four artists were already at work, and Aitken responded to the notification of his hiring by submitting designs, which were similar to the actual coins.

By January 29, all four artists had submitted bronze casts of their proposals. Dewey forwarded them to McAdoo, who solicited advice from the Commission of Fine Arts (which liked them), his Assistant Secretary, William Malburn (who did not), and Chief Engraver Charles E. Barber and others at the Philadelphia Mint (who offered suggestions). McAdoo had asked that the Mint prepare alternative designs for all the coins, and Barber did so, starting with the half dollar. Rejections to all four of the outside artists were sent on February 5 over McAdoo's signature. The reasons for this are uncertain, as the rejections are terse—Anthony Swiatek and Walter Breen, in their volume on commemoratives, assert that Malburn's opposition was decisive.

All four outside artists protested. Manship's objections were to no avail; McAdoo selected the design submitted by Barber for the half dollar. Longman asked for an explanation, submitted new designs, and came to Washington to discuss the matter. According to a letter several months later from Dewey, she fell ill there and was unable to participate further; numismatic historian Roger Burdette finds the explanation odd and suggests that there may have been some other reason. Barber was selected to design the quarter eagle. Both Atiken and Keck objected to the Commission of Fine Arts and to McAdoo; Keck also submitted additional designs. Both men met with McAdoo, Malburn and Dewey in Washington, and agreed to changes to their proposed designs. With that done, the $50 and $1 pieces were approved on March 6, 1915. The half dollar was approved two days later. Barber submitted his designs for the quarter eagle on March 16. They met an enthusiastic reception at the Treasury Department, and were approved.

== Designs ==
=== Barber's half dollar and quarter eagle ===
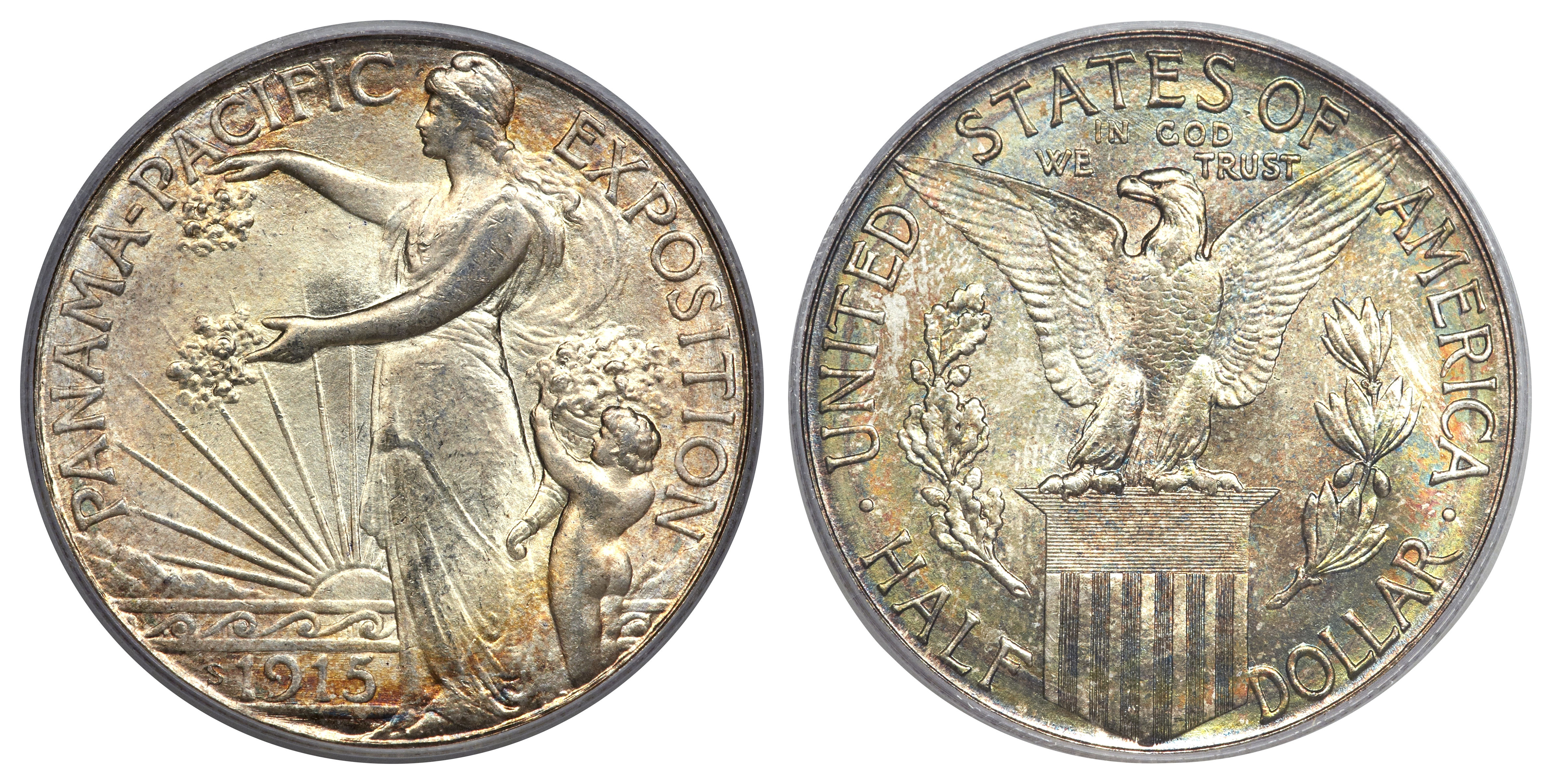
The Panama–Pacific half dollar

To what extent Mint Assistant Engraver (later Chief Engraver) George T. Morgan should be credited for work on the half dollar and quarter eagle is uncertain; Mint officials and employees were not consistent on this point. Assistant Director Mary M. O'Reilly said in 1936 that the bureau's records indicated that Barber was the designer. Later the same year, she forwarded a statement by an unnamed Philadelphia Mint employee stating that by the very nature of Barber's and Morgan's long association (Morgan was Barber's assistant for 37 years), the two engravers would have conferred frequently, and that Morgan's technique is "very obvious on both sides of both coins". The employee concluded that "no mistake could be made, in my opinion, in crediting both men with the execution of these two coins. I am certain that this is correct." Q. David Bowers, in his book on commemoratives, mentions the dispute, credits Barber on the obverses of both coins, and gives both men credit on the reverse of the half dollar. He asserts Morgan created the reverse of the quarter eagle.

The obverse of the half dollar depicts columbia, who is scattering fruits and flowers from a cornucopia held by a small, nude child. Behind them, the sun sets beyond San Francisco's Golden Gate, as yet unadorned by its bridge. Tom La Marre, in his 1987 article on the Panama–Pacific issue, pointed out that miners regarded the Golden Gate as a sign of good luck, and suggested it might have been better to depict it on a gold coin. The cornucopia, according to Burdette, demonstrates the advancement in trade brought by the canal, though the 1915 Report of the Director of the Mint states it "signif[ies] the boundless resources of the West". The obverse is based on Barber's earlier work, especially his medals for the annual Assay Commission. A representation of waves lies between the sun and the date, representing the maritime themes of the exposition. San Francisco's mint mark, S, is to the left of the date. The reverse depicts an eagle atop a Union shield, flanked by branches of olive, symbolizing peace, something Swiatek and Breen found ironic given the coin's issuance during World War I, and oak, the latter a choice which they were at a loss to explain. The 1915 Mint Director's report deemed the oak branch an "emblem of strength". Burdette notes that Barber's original design flanked the shield with two dolphins, representing the two oceans joined by the canal, instead of branches, and speculates, "McAdoo either did not understand the allegory, did not care for it, or simply did not like aquatic mammals on coins". McAdoo may also have been suffering from a surfeit of dolphins, as the dollar and octagonal $50 pieces bear them—the ones on the half dollar were removed and replaced by the branches.

Art historian Cornelius Vermeule deemed the obverse of the half dollar "a halfway point between the designs on French silver pieces early in the new century and A. A. Weinman's 'Walking Liberty' for the half dollar". The fifty-cent piece bears the motto "In God We Trust", as do the $50 pieces, the first commemorative coins to display it. That motto was first used on U.S. coins in 1864. In the 19th century, it was not mandatory that the motto be used, but it nevertheless appeared on most denominations of U.S. coins by the turn of the 20th century. In 1907 and 1908, there had been many objections to the motto's omission on the gold ten dollar and twenty dollar pieces designed by Augustus Saint-Gaudens. In response to the public outcry, Congress in 1908 passed legislation requiring its presence on any circulating coin which had previously borne it, as both gold pieces had until 1907. The wording on the Panama–Pacific pieces was left to the discretion of the Secretary of the Treasury, but officials may have remembered the fracas. Swiatek and Breen suggested that those involved in creating or approving the design may have moved to head off controversy.

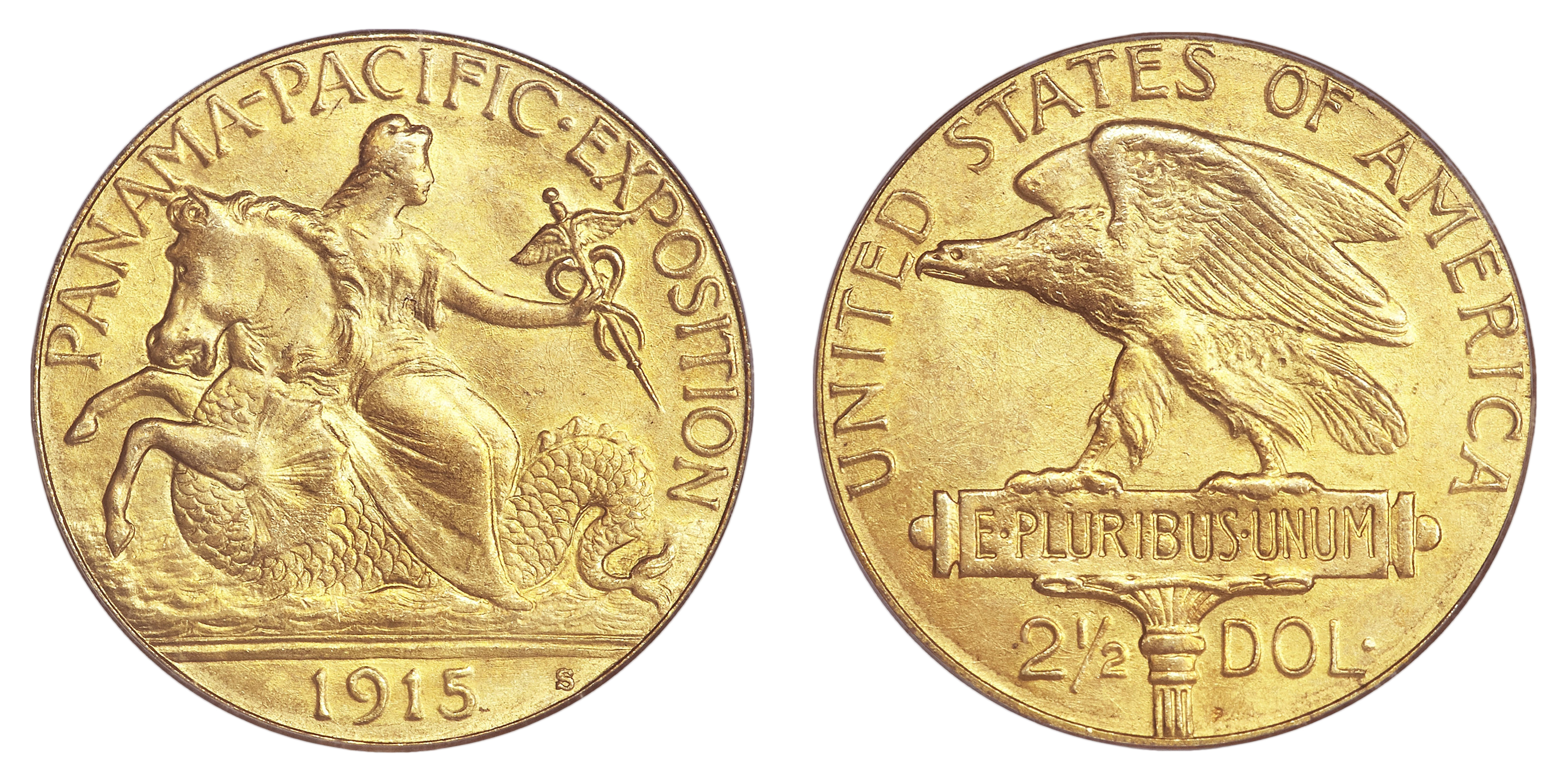
The quarter eagle

Barber's quarter eagle (the first of that denomination issued as a commemorative) depicts, according to the Mint Director's report, "Columbia, representing the United States, seated [on] the mythical sea horse [a hippocampus], riding through the waters of the canal, with caduceus in grasp, the emblem of trade and commerce, inviting the nations of the world to use the new way from ocean to ocean. Reverse: American eagle, resting on a standard bearing the motto 'E Pluribus Unum' ". The mint mark is on the obverse, to the right of the date. Swiatek and Breen suggested that the caduceus (in modern usage a symbol of medicine) is "said to represent the medical breakthroughs of Col. William C. Gorgas's successful campaign" to control malaria and yellow fever at the canal site. They wrote that on the reverse, the "defiant eagle probably alludes to the necessity of keeping the Canal open during World War I; the whole composition is meant to suggest a Roman legionary standard, which was a pole surmounted by some such device".

The obverse of the quarter eagle, Vermeule opined, derived from coins of ancient Greece depicting a "Nereid, perhaps Thetis, who bears the shield of Achilles astride a hippocamp". He suggested that the quarter eagle obverse "may be Barber's answer to Theodore Roosevelt's and Augustus Saint-Gaudens' clamor for modern coins in the Greek manner". The half dollar's reverse, along with that of the quarter eagle, "are classic symphonies of old designs, motifs that trace back to the eagles and shields of [Charles Barber's predecessors as Chief Engraver] Longacre and William Barber revised into modern form."

=== Dollar and $50 pieces ===
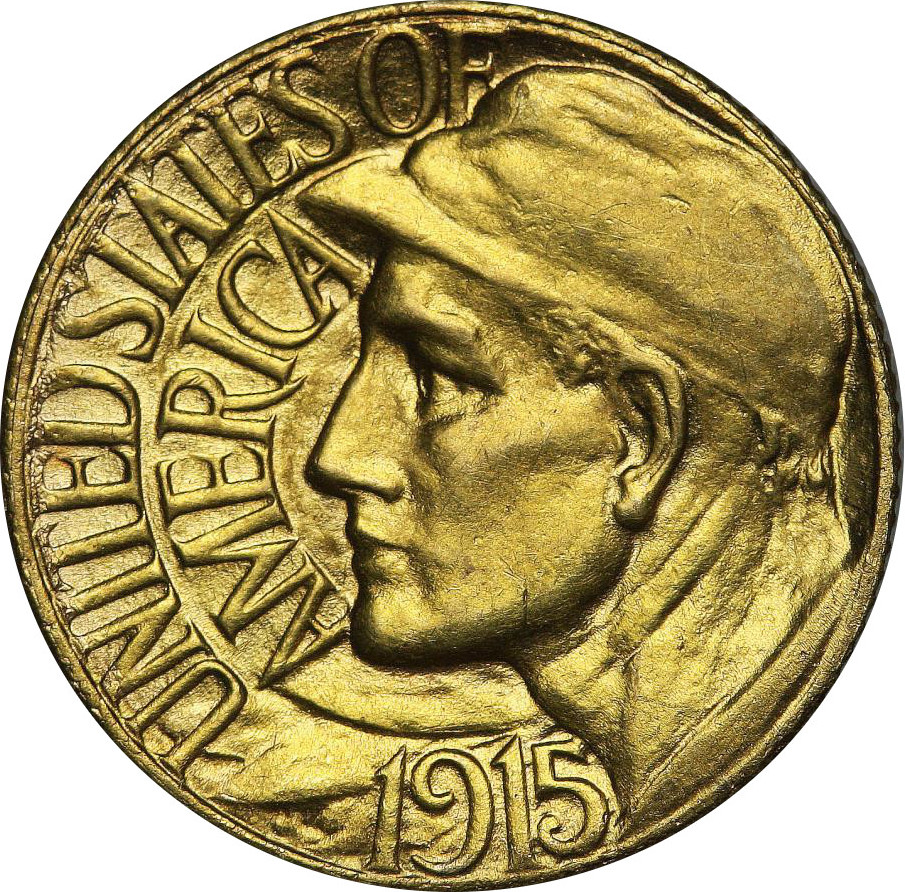
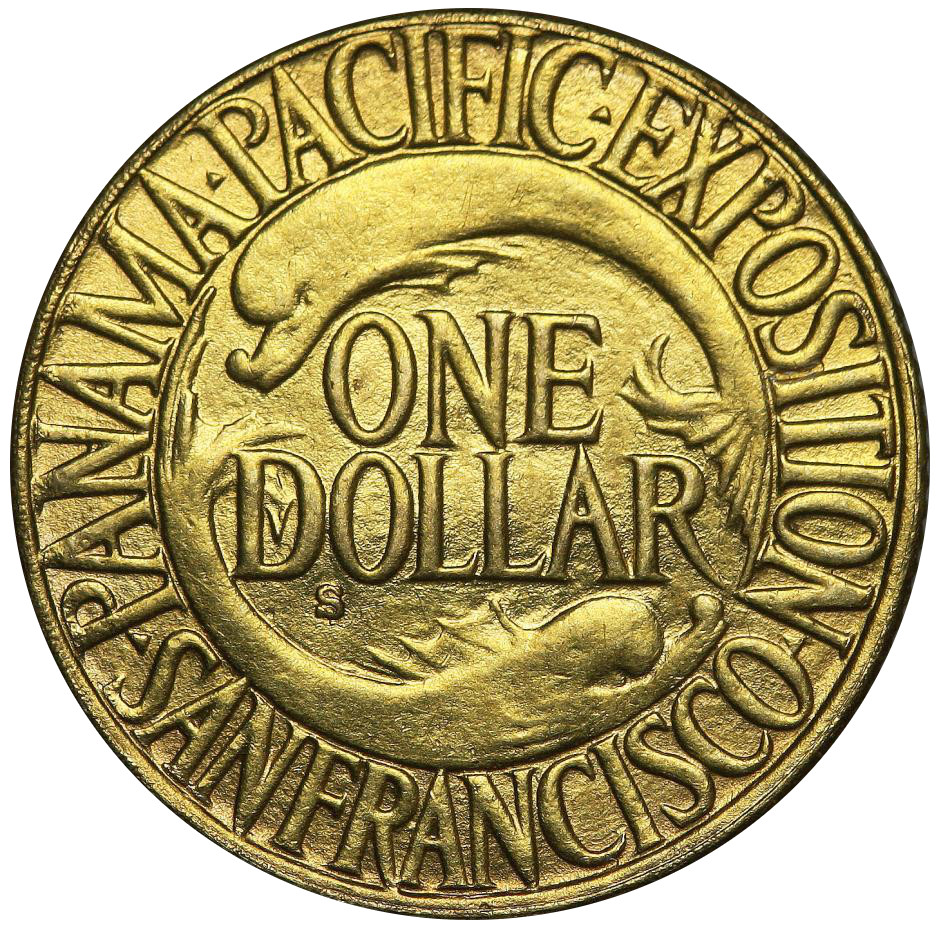
Charles Keck's gold dollar

Charles Keck's obverse for the dollar was one of the alternative designs submitted to McAdoo, depicting the unadorned, capped head of a Panama Canal construction worker—Keck's original concept had featured Poseidon, god of the sea in Greek mythology. The worker, who represents the labor necessary to build the canal, is sometimes mistaken for a baseball player. Keck's reverse contains the words "Panama–Pacific Exposition", "San Francisco", the denomination of the coin, and two dolphins, symbolizing the joining of the Atlantic and Pacific oceans by the canal. The mint mark is beneath the letters D and O in "Dollar".

Vermeule called Keck's dollar "a novel, daring use of the limited area afforded by such a small, thin coin. Compared with the earlier gold dollars, the coin is a work of art." Numismatist Arlie Slabaugh, in his volume on commemoratives, noted that the Panama–Pacific dollar "presents a bold American design, completely different from the classical styles used on the other denominations".

Aitken explained his design for the $50 pieces:

In order to express in my design the fact that this coin is struck to commemorate the Panama–Pacific Exposition, and as the exposition stands for all that wisdom and industry have produced, I have used as the central motive [motif] of the obverse, the head of the virgin goddess Minerva. She is the goddess of wisdom, of skill, of contemplation ... Moreover, she features prominently on the seal of the State of California ... the use of the dolphins on the octagonal coin do much to add to its charm, as well as express the uninterrupted water route made possible by the canal. Upon the reverse I use the owl, the bird sacred to Minerva, also the symbol of wisdom ... With these simple symbols, all full of beauty in themselves, I feel that I have expressed the larger meaning of the exposition, its appeal to the intellect.

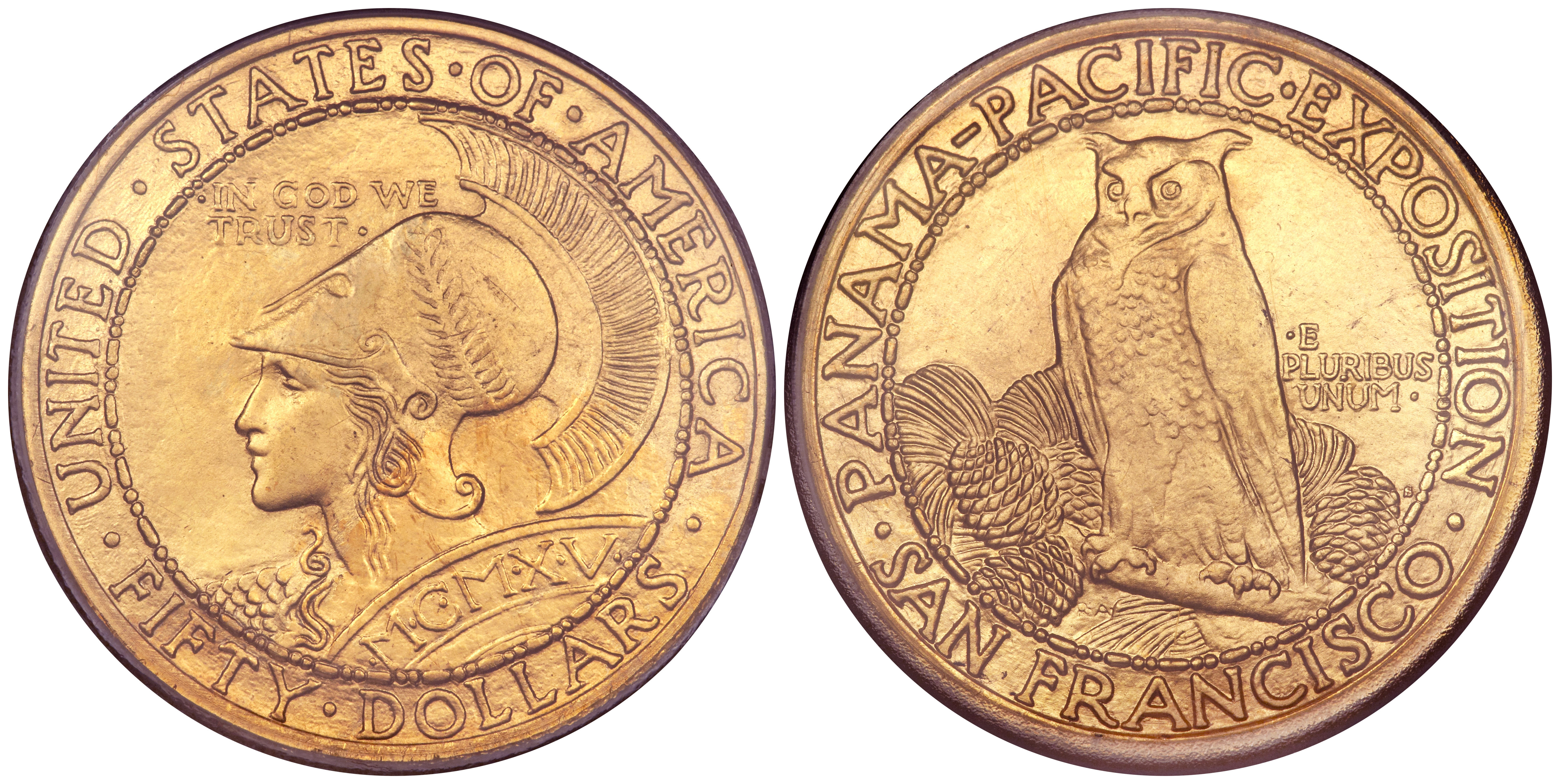
Robert Ingersoll Aitken's round $50 piece

The goddess wears a crested helmet, as her Greek equivalent, Pallas Athena, was commonly depicted on ancient coins; it is pushed back to signify her peaceful intentions. She wears mail, which Swiatek and Breen found an odd anachronism. She bears upon her shield the Roman numerals MCMXV for the year 1915, the second use of Roman numerals on U.S. coins after the early types of the 1907 Saint-Gaudens double eagle. Though Aitken had originally expressed the date as "1915" in his original sketches, he soon changed his mind, "As these designs will not be used in any other year, there will be no need to change the year as we must on other coins."

Kevin Flynn, in his book on commemorative coins, described the branch on which the owl perches as that of a ponderosa pine tree; several cones are visible. The design on the octagonal piece is smaller than on the round, to allow space for the border featuring the dolphins. The mint mark is on the reverse, adjacent to the rightmost pine cone and directly above the letter "O" in "San Francisco".

The design for the $50 received contemporary criticism; some suggested that the presence of the dolphins on the octagonal coin implied that the canal had been constructed for cetacean convenience. A 1916 column in the American Journal of Numismatics contained the conclusion that "the criticism often heard that 'there is nothing American about the coin except the inscription' is fully warranted." Swiatek and Breen dismissed criticisms as "numerous and mostly irrelevant, based on total misreading of the iconography. [McAdoo began it] with stupid claims that Pallas Athena meant nothing on a U.S. coin unless she could be identified with Liberty, and that Athena's owl would never mean anything to all of us". Vermeule deemed the $50 coins "a tour de force, dated to be sure, but unusual enough in all respects to be worthy of what American numismatic art could achieve". Later Chief Engraver Elizabeth Jones felt that the $50 pieces were "stylistically in step with the period [and have] considerable artistic merits". Jeff Garrett and Ron Guth, in their book on U.S. gold coins, deemed the Panama–Pacific $50 pieces "one of the most stunning issues ever produced by the U.S. government".

== Production and distribution ==
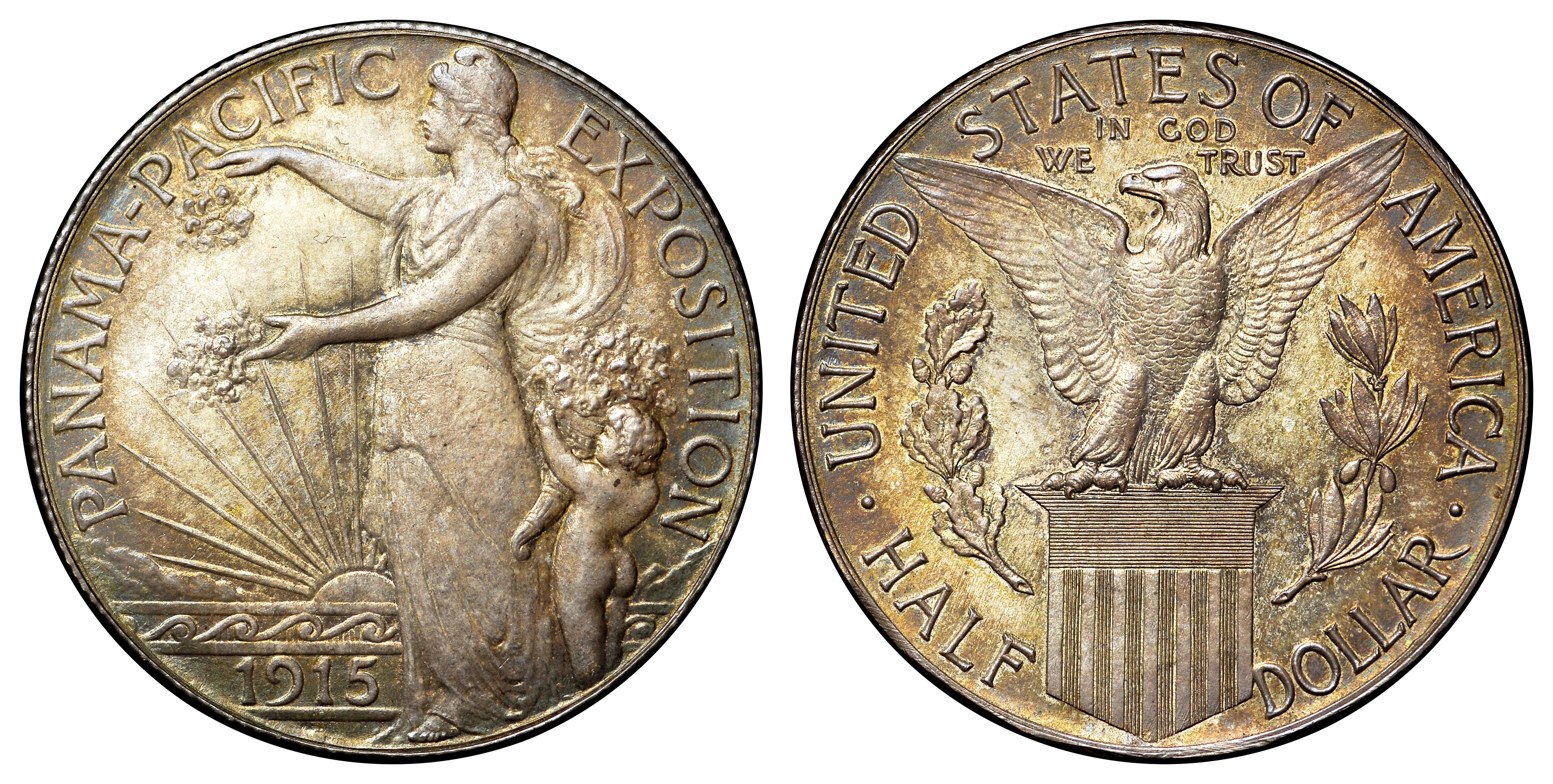
Experimental version of the half dollar, lacking the mint mark "S"

Once the designs were approved, the artists prepared bronze casts to be sent to the Medallic Art Company in New York. There, hubs would be made that the Mint could use to produce coinage dies, as the company could do it faster than could the Mint. The Panama–Pacific issues are the first American coins known to have been produced from hubs provided by a private company—the Medallic Art Company prepared hubs for the 1913 Buffalo nickel, but it is uncertain if they were used. The Panama–Pacific hubs were sent to the Philadelphia Mint, where the Engraving Department, headed by Barber, would produce the necessary dies. Although the authorizing statute required that the coins be struck in San Francisco, all coinage dies at that time were produced by Barber and his assistants in Philadelphia.

By April, Robert W. Woolley had been commissioned as Director of the Mint, and he approved samples of the gold dollar, the first to have work completed, on April 22. He then traveled to San Francisco, and was there when the dies for the dollar arrived on the 27th. When the San Francisco Mint's coiner examined them, they proved to be lacking the mint mark "S", customary on coins produced there. Woolley was not sure if this was intentional, and wired to Philadelphia Mint Superintendent Adam M. Joyce on the 29th. Upon learning that it was intentional—Joyce reasoned that as the entire mintage of this, the first commemorative issue to be struck outside Philadelphia, would be produced at San Francisco, there was no need to use a mint mark—Woolley ordered that the dies at San Francisco and in transit be returned to Philadelphia, and new ones produced with the mint mark. Woolley believed that people would assume the coins were struck at Philadelphia, which did not then use a mint mark. Burdette notes that the San Francisco Mint was a source of local pride and the omission of the mint mark would likely have led to widespread protest, and possibly to two varieties of each of the new coins: with mint mark, and without. New dollar dies were sent from Philadelphia on May 3, and for the half dollar the following day. Dies for the $50 followed on May 14, and for the quarter eagle on May 27.

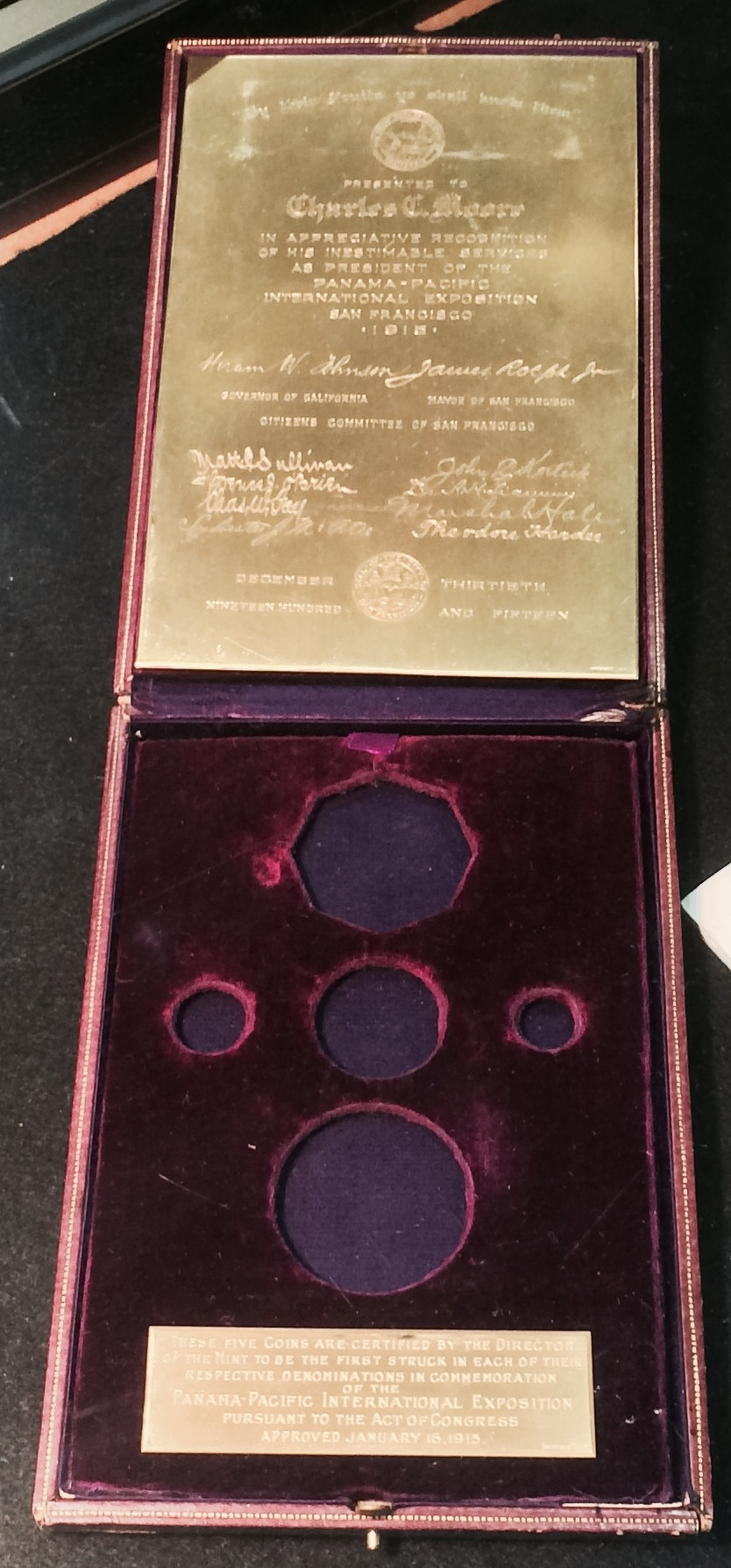
Special case in which the coins given to the exposition's president, Charles Moore, were placed

Containing 2.4286 troy ounces (2.6645 oz; 75.54 g) of gold and measuring 44.9 millimetres (1.77 in) across for the octagonal) and 43 millimetres (1.7 in) in diameter for the round, the $50 pieces were the largest and heaviest U.S. coins issued until surpassed in 2010 by the America the Beautiful silver bullion coins. The octagonal $50 piece is the only U.S. coin that is not round. The facilities at the San Francisco Mint were inadequate to strike such large coins as the $50 pieces, and a hydraulic medal press was shipped from Philadelphia. This press was ceremoniously operated at that mint on June 15, 1915 for the initial striking of $50 octagonal pieces; the first by San Francisco Mint Superintendent T. W. H. Shanahan, for presentation to the exposition's president, Charles C. Moore. The next nine were struck by other dignitaries, including Congressman Kahn. Anyone else present with the price of $100 per coin was then allowed to strike their own piece, and at least three people, including Dewey's wife and the local postmaster, did so.

The Panama–Pacific Exposition Company hired Farran Zerbe to sell the new coins at the fair. Despite the provisions of the law mandating a delivery of coins before the fair's opening, the only government products Zerbe initially had to vend at his "Money of the World" exhibit were a souvenir medal, designed by Aitken and struck by a press operating at the Mint's exhibit, and prints produced by the Bureau of Engraving and Printing, also on-site. Sales of the medal were slow, and Zerbe did not have coins to sell until soon after May 8, 1915, when the half dollar and dollar dies were received. Zerbe found the coins hard to sell; many potential purchasers, faced with a plethora of medals, reproductions of Gold Rush-era pioneer gold coins, and other wares from a variety of vendors, did not believe his coins were official government products. Treasury officials agreed to allow him space for a salesperson at the Mint's exhibit, and the two lower denominations were sold there, with orders taken for the $50 pieces. Soon, though, Zerbe stopped selling the gold dollar there, and the rest of the fair's run was marked by conflict between him and Treasury representatives. The full legal allocation for each denomination had been struck, but though Zerbe continued selling coins by mail after the fair closed on December 4, 1915, sales dropped through 1916. Zerbe continued to sell coins on behalf of the exposition until at least November 1916, and at some point, he sold an unknown quantity to himself to supply the future needs of his coin business. The remainder were melted by the Treasury.

The Mint struck 1,500 of each of the two $50 pieces, plus nine extra of the octagonal and ten of the round, to be sent to Philadelphia to await the 1916 meeting of the annual Assay Commission, when they would be available for inspection and testing. (Note: It was a privilege of members of the Assay Commission, appointed annually from the public and government officials, to purchase at face value coins submitted for testing but not used, and members of the 1916 commission sought to purchase the Panama–Pacific pieces. Woolley refused, and the coins were melted. See Burdette, p. 293.) Zerbe had arranged for special display boxes and cases. A set of four denominations (with the purchaser's choice of round or octagonal for the $50) cost $100; a set of five cost $200. Copper display frames with two of each coin were said by Slabaugh to have cost $400, but Swiatek, in his 2011 book on commemoratives, indicates that these sets may actually have been given to dignitaries, as no sales receipts or correspondence relating to them are known. A set of the three smaller denominations sold for $7, the half dollar at $1, the gold dollar at $2 or $2.25 (prices may have varied), and the quarter eagle at $4 each.

== Collecting and mintages ==
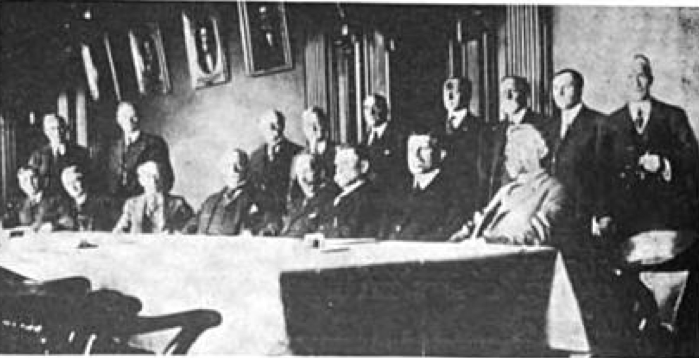
The 1916 United States Assay Commission met on February 9 and 10, 1916, to test coins from 1915. Among the members and Mint officials shown are Mint Director Robert W. Woolley (standing fourth from left), Chief Engraver Charles E. Barber (standing third from left) and Philadelphia Mint Superintendent Adam Joyce (standing at far right).

More of the octagonal $50 pieces were sold than of the round, as the former proved more popular because of the association with the Gold Rush, and because people liked the dolphins. As half of the 3,000 authorized mintage for the $50 pieces were of each variety, this meant more of the round ones would be melted, leaving the round $50 with the lowest distribution of any U.S. commemorative coin, about 483—the runner up being the octagonal with about 645, though sources vary on the exact numbers distributed. The half dollar and dollar are known struck in different metals; pieces believed to have been struck to create rarities.

The $50 pieces stood as the highest denomination U.S. coins for many years. In 1986, the Mint began producing the American Gold Eagle, also with face value $50. The record was surpassed with the American Platinum Eagle with a face value of $100, in 1997.

R.S. Yeoman's A Guide Book of United States Coins, published in 2018, lists the Panama–Pacific half dollar at between $375 and $2,500, depending on condition. The dollar lists at between $525 and $1,775 and the quarter eagle between $1,550 and $6,000. The round $50 piece lists for between about $55,000 and $240,000, and the octagonal for between $55,000 and $245,000 depending on condition.

Denomination	Mintage	Assay coins	Melted	Net distribution
Half dollar	60,000	0–30 (Note: Burdette reports no half dollars set aside for assay. See Burdette, p. 392. Swiatek reports 30 struck for assay. See Swiatek, p. 88. Swiatek's figure agrees with that in the report of the 1916 Assay Commission. See Report of the Secretary of the Treasury on the State of the Finances, 1916, p. 399.)	32,866	27,134
Gold dollar	25,000	34	10,000	15,000
Quarter eagle	10,000	17	3,251	6,749
$50 octagonal	1,500	9	855	645
$50 round	1,500	10	1,017	483

== Sources ==
- Bowers, Q. David (1992). Commemorative Coins of the United States: A Complete Encyclopedia. Wolfeboro, NH: Bowers and Merena Galleries, Inc. ISBN 9780943161358.
- Burdette, Roger W. (2007). Renaissance of American Coinage, 1909–1915. Great Falls, VA: Seneca Mill Press. ISBN 978-0-9768986-2-7.
- Flynn, Kevin (2008). The Authoritative Reference on Commemorative Coins 1892–1954. Roswell, GA: Kyle Vick. OCLC 711779330.
- Garrett, Jeff; Guth, Ron (2008). Encyclopedia of U.S. Gold Coins, 1795–1933 (second ed.). Atlanta, GA: Whitman Publishing. ISBN 978-0-7948-2254-5.
- Jones, Elizabeth (November 4–5, 1989). Metcalf, William E. (ed.). Reflections on the Gold Coinage of the Twentieth Century. America's Gold Coinage. New York: American Numismatic Society. pp. 111–131. ISBN 0-89722-238-5.
- La Marre, Tom (November 1987). "The Canal Commemoratives". COINage. Encino, CA: Behn-Miller Publishers, Inc.: 62–64, 68.
- Slabaugh, Arlie R. (1975). United States Commemorative Coinage (second ed.). Racine, WI: Whitman Publishing. ISBN 978-0-307-09377-6.
- Swiatek, Anthony (2012). Encyclopedia of the Commemorative Coins of the United States. Chicago: KWS Publishers. ISBN 978-0-9817736-7-4.
- Swiatek, Anthony; Breen, Walter (1981). The Encyclopedia of United States Silver & Gold Commemorative Coins, 1892 to 1954. New York: Arco Publishing. ISBN 978-0-668-04765-4.
- Taxay, Don (1967). An Illustrated History of U.S. Commemorative Coinage. New York: Arco Publishing. ISBN 978-0-668-01536-3.
- "History of 'In God We Trust'". United States Department of the Treasury. March 8, 2011.
- Vermeule, Cornelius (1971). Numismatic Art in America. Cambridge, MA: The Belknap Press of Harvard University Press. ISBN 978-0-674-62840-3.
- Yeoman, R.S. (2018). A Guide Book of United States Coins 2014 (Mega Red 4th ed.). Atlanta, GA: Whitman Publishing, LLC. ISBN 978-0-7948-4580-3.
