= List of United States commemorative coins (1920s) =

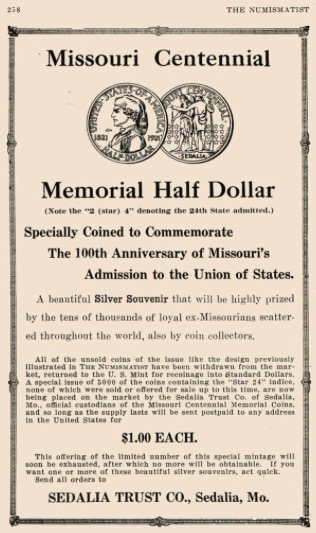
May 1922 advertisement for the 2★4 variety of the Missouri Centennial half dollar

The United States has struck commemorative coins since 1848 to commemorate the anniversaries of people, places, and events. Commemorative coins have a face value and are legal tender, though they are sold at premium as souvenirs. Most commemorative coins are sold to coin collectors. The classic era of commemorative coins began in 1892 with the issuance of the Columbian Exposition half dollar. This list includes the major varieties of United States commemorative coins struck in the 1920s.

The 1920s saw an expansion in practices described as "exploitative" by numismatic author Q. David Bowers. Commemorative coins were struck by the United States Mint and sent to local organizations, sometimes controlled by an private individual, who set the sale price and distribution procedures. The decade saw the introduction of different dates, varieties, and designs for specific issues to encourage coin collectors to purchase each coin to complete their collections. The Pilgrim Tercentenary half dollar, Alabama Centennial half dollar, Missouri Centennial half dollar, and Grant Memorial coinage followed this trend. Many subjects of questionable importance were commemorated, with Congress passing legislation for commemorative coins partly due to political influence from sponsors. The Monroe Doctrine Centennial half dollar was distributed by the film industry in Hollywood for a motion picture exposition, with the historical subject selected to legitimize the coin.

The Stone Mountain Memorial half dollar, issued in 1925 to raise funds for the Stone Mountain Memorial, saw the most significant marketing of the classic era, though sales fell short by millions of coins. The issue also saw criticism for honoring the Lost Cause of the Confederacy. The United States Sesquicentennial coinage of 1926 issued for the Sesquicentennial Exposition sold below expectations as well, with most of the mintage being melted; the Sesquicentennial quarter eagle was the last gold commemorative coin struck during the classic era.

The Oregon Trail Memorial half dollar was struck at both the Philadelphia Mint and San Francisco Mint in 1926, and was struck again in 1928 and later throughout most of the 1930s, creating more varieties for collectors to buy. This practice continued throughout the 1930s for several commemorative coins.

== Commemorative coins ==
(P)	No mint mark, struck at the Philadelphia Mint
S	S mint mark, struck at the San Francisco Mint
(S)	No mint mark, struck at the San Francisco Mint

Commemorative coins issued by the United States in the 1920s
Coin	Year(s)	Obverse design	Reverse design	Designer	Composition	Mintage (mint)	Obverse	Reverse	Ref.
Maine Centennial half dollar	1920	Arms of Maine	Inscription surrounded by a pine wreath	Anthony de Francisci, based on sketches by Harry Cochrane	90% silver, 10% copper	50,028 (Note: 28 coins were for assay.) (P)			
Pilgrim Tercentenary half dollar	1920	Governor William Bradford standing with a book	The Mayflower	Cyrus E. Dallin	90% silver, 10% copper	200,112 (Note: 48,000 coins were melted. 112 coins were for assay.) (P)			
Pilgrim Tercentenary half dollar	1921	Governor William Bradford, 1921 in field	The Mayflower	Cyrus E. Dallin	90% silver, 10% copper	100,053 (Note: 80,000 coins were melted. 53 coins were for assay.) (P)			
Missouri Centennial half dollar	1921	Portrait of Daniel Boone	Daniel Boone and a Native American, with the inscription SEDALIA	Robert Ingersoll Aitken	90% silver, 10% copper	11,400 (distribution estimated) (Note: 50,028 coins were minted in total for both varieties. 29,600 coins were melted. 28 coins were for assay.) (P)			
Missouri Centennial half dollar (2★4 variety)	1921	Portrait of Daniel Boone, 2★4 in field	Daniel Boone and a Native American, with the inscription SEDALIA	Robert Ingersoll Aitken	90% silver, 10% copper	9,400 (distribution estimated) (P)			
Alabama Centennial half dollar	1921	Portraits of Thomas Kilby and William Bibb	Adaptation of the State Seal of Alabama	Laura Gardin Fraser	90% silver, 10% copper	35,000 (distribution estimated) (Note: 70,044 coins were minted in total for both varieties. 5,000 coins were melted. 44 coins were for assay.) (P)			
Alabama Centennial half dollar (2X2 variety)	1921	Portraits of Thomas Kilby and William Bibb, 2X2 in field	Adaptation of the State Seal of Alabama	Laura Gardin Fraser	90% silver, 10% copper	30,000 (distribution estimated) (P)			
Grant Memorial half dollar (without star)	1922	Portrait of Ulysses S. Grant	The Grant Birthplace cabin amidst trees	Laura Gardin Fraser	90% silver, 10% copper	95,055 (Note: 27,650 coins were melted. 55 coins were for assay.) (P)			
Grant Memorial half dollar (with star)	1922	Portrait of Ulysses S. Grant, star above GRANT	The Grant Birthplace cabin amidst trees	Laura Gardin Fraser	90% silver, 10% copper	5,006 (Note: 750 coins were melted. 6 coins were for assay.) (P)			
Grant Memorial dollar (without star)	1922	Portrait of Ulysses S. Grant	The Grant Birthplace cabin amidst trees	Laura Gardin Fraser	90% gold, 10% copper	5,000 (P)			
Grant Memorial dollar (with star)	1922	Portrait of Ulysses S. Grant, star above GRANT	The Grant Birthplace cabin amidst trees	Laura Gardin Fraser	90% gold, 10% copper	5,016 (Note: 16 coins were for assay.) (P)			
Monroe Doctrine Centennial half dollar	1923	Portraits of James Monroe and John Quincy Adams	Stylized figures representing North and South America touch at the Panama Canal (Note: Beach copied the design from the 1901 Pan-American Exposition medal designed by Raphael Beck in 1899.)	Chester Beach	90% silver, 10% copper	274,077 (Note: 77 coins were for assay.) S			
Huguenot-Walloon half dollar	1924	Portraits of Gaspard de Coligny and William the Silent	The ship Nieuw Nederlandt	George T. Morgan	90% silver, 10% copper	142,080 (Note: 80 coins were for assay.) (P)			
Lexington–Concord Sesquicentennial half dollar	1925	The Minute Man statue in Concord, Massachusetts	The Old Belfry in Lexington, Massachusetts	Chester Beach	90% silver, 10% copper	162,099 (Note: 86 coins were melted. 99 coins were for assay.) (P)			
Stone Mountain Memorial half dollar	1925	Robert E. Lee and Stonewall Jackson on horseback	Eagle perched on a cliff	Gutzon Borglum	90% silver, 10% copper	2,314,709 (Note: 1,000,000 coins were melted. 4,709 coins were for assay.) (P)			
California Diamond Jubilee half dollar	1925	A miner panning for gold	Grizzly bear, from the Flag of California	Jo Mora	90% silver, 10% copper	150,200 (Note: 63,606 coins were melted. 200 coins were for assay.) S			
Fort Vancouver Centennial half dollar	1925	Portrait of John McLoughlin	Pioneer with Fort Vancouver in background	Laura Gardin Fraser	90% silver, 10% copper	50,028 (Note: 35,034 coins were melted. 28 coins were for assay.) (S) (Note: The coins were supposed to have a mint mark, but it was omitted in error.)			
United States Sesquicentennial half dollar	1926	Portraits of George Washington and Calvin Coolidge	The Liberty Bell	John R. Sinnock, based on sketches by John Frederick Lewis	90% silver, 10% copper	1,000,528 (Note: 859,408 coins were melted. 528 coins were for assay.) (P)			
United States Sesquicentennial quarter eagle	1926	Liberty, bearing a scroll and a torch	The front of Independence Hall	John R. Sinnock	90% gold, 10% copper	200,226 (Note: 154,207 coins were melted. 226 coins were for assay.) (P)			
Oregon Trail Memorial half dollar	1926	Native American standing in front of a map of the United States	Conestoga wagon traveling west towards the sunset	James Earle Fraser and Laura Gardin Fraser	90% silver, 10% copper	48,030 (Note: 75 defective coins coins were melted. 30 coins were for assay.) (P); 100,055 (Note: 17,000 coins were melted. 55 coins were for assay.) S			
Vermont Sesquicentennial half dollar	1927	Portrait of Ira Allen	Cougar facing left	Charles Keck	90% silver, 10% copper	40,034 (Note: 11,892 coins were melted. 34 coins were for assay.4) (P)			
Oregon Trail Memorial half dollar	1928	Native American standing in front of a map of the United States	Conestoga wagon traveling west towards the sunset	James Earle Fraser and Laura Gardin Fraser	90% silver, 10% copper	50,028 (Note: 44,000 coins were melted. 28 coins were for assay.) (P)			
Hawaii Sesquicentennial half dollar	1928	Portrait of James Cook	Hawaiian chieftain standing with extended arm	Juliette May Fraser	90% silver, 10% copper	10,008 (Note: 50 coins were sandblast proofs. 8 coins were for assay.) (P)			
