= Grant Birthplace =

Historic house in Ohio, United States

- U.S. Grant Birthplace and Grant Commemorative Sites Historic District
- U.S. National Register of Historic Places
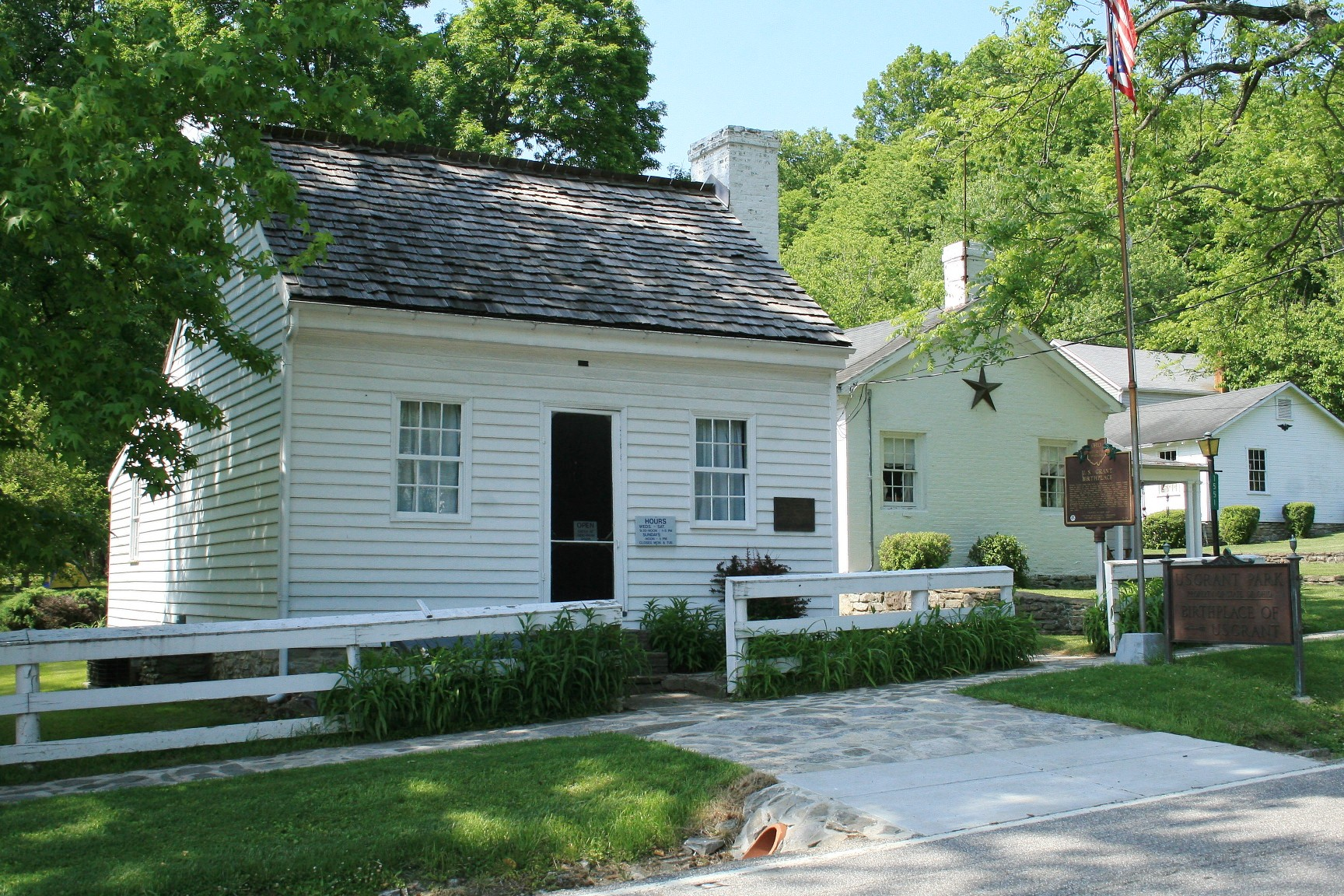
- The Grant Birthplace in Point Pleasant, Ohio
- Location: U.S. Route 52 and State Route 232, Point Pleasant, Ohio
- Coordinates: 38°53′39″N 84°13′58″W
- Area: 4 acres (1.6 ha)
- Built: 1817
- Architect: Goller, Harsh & Davies
- NRHP reference No.: 98001013
- Added to NRHP: August 6, 1998

The Grant Birthplace (also known as the U.S. Grant Birthplace) is a historic house museum in Point Pleasant, Monroe Township, Clermont County, Ohio, United States. Built in 1817 near a local tannery, the one-story frame house was the birthplace, on April 27, 1822, of Ulysses S. Grant, who went on to command the Union Army during the American Civil War and to serve as the 18th President of the United States. Grant lived in the house for less than a year before his family relocated to nearby Georgetown, Ohio.

After Grant's death in 1885, the house was dismantled and relocated several times for public display before being returned to its original foundation in 1936. It is now operated as a museum by the Ohio History Connection in partnership with Historic New Richmond, Inc. In 1998 the birthplace and several associated commemorative sites were listed on the National Register of Historic Places as the U.S. Grant Birthplace and Grant Commemorative Sites Historic District.

== History ==
=== Construction and the Grant family (1817–1823) ===
The cottage was built in 1817 near a tannery in Point Pleasant, a small settlement on the banks of the Ohio River. In 1821, Jesse Root Grant, by then overseeing the local tannery, married Hannah Simpson; the couple moved into the small house, paying $2 a month in rent. Their first child, Hiram Ulysses Grant (later Ulysses S. Grant, after a clerical error at his 1839 West Point nomination transposed his given names and substituted his mother's maiden name, Simpson, for an initial), was born there on April 27, 1822. Before Ulysses turned one, the family left Point Pleasant for Georgetown, Ohio.

=== Relocation and commemoration (1885–1922) ===
Following Grant's death in 1885, supporters had the house dismantled and shipped downriver by barge to Cincinnati, where it went on display at the Ohio Valley Centennial Exposition. Columbus attorney and businessman Henry T. Chittenden saw the display and subsequently purchased the house, moving it to Goodale Park in Columbus, (Note: Sources differ on the purchase price and precise timeline. The Ohio History Connection states Chittenden purchased the house for $3,000 following its display at the 1885 Cincinnati exposition. A more detailed account by Clermont County's honorary historian, Gary Knepp, holds that an unnamed Clermont County blacksmith bought the house in 1887 and moved it to Cincinnati himself, charging admission to view it; Chittenden's agent, William Burdell, then negotiated its purchase from the blacksmith, who had initially demanded $5,000, down to $1,700 plus moving expenses. This article follows OHC's figure in the main text as the site's current institutional source, but flags the discrepancy here.) where it became a focal point of the 1888 national encampment of the Grand Army of the Republic; independent estimates put total attendance at the weeklong encampment near 100,000 veterans, with 50,000 to 70,000 marching in the event's parade. By the time the cottage was moved on to the Ohio State Fairgrounds, roughly ten years of open-air display and constant visitor traffic had taken a visible toll on its condition. A protective enclosure of glass and limestone was raised around the structure in 1896; it was dedicated on September 3 of that year in a ceremony before a crowd estimated at over four thousand, with addresses by Governor Asa S. Bushnell and Chittenden.

Back in Point Pleasant, a different house had since been built on the original site, but that didn't stop preservation-minded enthusiasts from marking the spot: in 1907 they placed a Civil War-era cannon there alongside a plaque honoring Grant. The push to bring the cottage home in earnest began with Grant's 1922 birth centennial, when Ohio created the U.S. Grant State Memorial Association and a Grant Centenary Commission to organize the effort. That February, Congress authorized a set of commemorative Grant gold-dollar and silver half-dollar coins, selling a portion of the proceeds toward improving the five miles of road connecting New Richmond and Moscow to the site. Access kept improving over the following years: the Grant Memorial Bridge across Indian Creek opened in 1927, followed by additional road work jointly funded by federal, state, and local governments in 1928.

=== Return to Point Pleasant (1936) ===
Ohio state representative John J. Hayden introduced the legislation that authorized the birthplace's return to Point Pleasant, and the relocation was carried out with the assistance of the Works Progress Administration. The move took place in March 1936: crews took the fairgrounds structure apart piece by piece, loaded it onto six trucks, and carried it to Point Pleasant, where it sat in storage inside a barn while preparations were made for its return. A newer, two-story house had stood on the birthplace's original plot since the 1880s; workers relocated that building to a neighboring lot to clear the way, then rebuilt the birthplace cottage on its original stone foundation. A formal rededication ceremony followed on October 4, 1936, with state and local dignitaries in attendance, and the organization now known as the Ohio History Connection went on to furnish the interior with period pieces and objects that had belonged to the Grant family.

=== National Register listing and recent history ===
The birthplace and several associated commemorative sites were added to the National Register of Historic Places on August 6, 1998, as the U.S. Grant Birthplace and Grant Commemorative Sites Historic District, a 4-acre district credited to builders Goller, Harsh & Davies. Historic New Richmond, Inc. handles the site's day-to-day operation, working alongside the Ohio History Connection to keep it open to visitors. In the summer of 2010, a small-scale construction project to bring the site into compliance with the Americans with Disabilities Act involved replacing stone gutters around the house.

== Archaeology ==
The property has drawn several rounds of archaeological attention over the years. When crews returned in 2010 to replace the site's stone gutters as part of an ADA compliance project, Ohio State Historic Preservation Office archaeologists took the opportunity to test-excavate the surrounding ground; buried remnants of an 1810s tannery building turned up in the process, consistent with the site's earlier use by the Grant family.

Two earlier projects had already touched the grounds. In 1984, work to replace a nearby bridge disturbed a small refuse midden containing pottery shards from the early 1800s. Then in 2005, ahead of a small building project on the property, archaeologists surveyed the open portions of the grounds and turned up only a handful of stone flakes, too generic to be linked to any particular era of prehistoric activity.

== Description ==
The Grant Birthplace is a one-story, timber-frame cottage. The historic district encompasses roughly four acres at the junction of U.S. Route 52 and State Route 232 in Point Pleasant and includes the reconstructed birthplace along with associated commemorative features tied to its long relocation history. The house is furnished with a combination of objects that once belonged to the Grant family and period pieces representative of the era.

Rather than hinging on the birthplace cottage's own architecture, the district's National Register listing is grounded mainly in the property's role as a commemorative landscape: the nomination qualifies the birthplace and its related commemorative sites under NRHP Criterion A for their connection to Grant's birth, and separately under Criterion Consideration F, the category reserved for groups of memorial structures. One such contributing feature is the Grant Memorial Bridge spanning Indian Creek, built by the Brookville Construction Company between 1925 and 1927 as a steel truss crossing; a 1984 rebuild replaced the truss itself with a modern concrete-deck span, so the bridge's roadway is not considered historic. What survives from the original structure are its stone entrance pylons, a pair of bronze lampposts, and bronze plaques carrying short biographies of Grant, one of them cast with his likeness in relief.

== Visiting ==
The site is open to the public seasonally from April through September, Wednesday through Saturday from 10 a.m. to 5 p.m. and Sunday from 1 p.m. to 5 p.m.; it is closed Mondays, Tuesdays, and Independence Day. There is no charge to visit, though the site accepts donations.

== See also ==
- Grant Boyhood Home, Georgetown, Ohio
- Ulysses S. Grant National Historic Site, near St. Louis
- Ulysses S. Grant Home, Galena, Illinois
- Grant Cottage State Historic Site, Mt. McGregor, New York
- General Grant National Memorial (Grant's Tomb)
- List of residences of presidents of the United States
