= List of United States commemorative coins (1950s) =

== 1950 ==
=== Non-circulating coins ===
Face value	Coin	Obverse design	Reverse design	Composition	Mintage	Available	Obverse	Reverse
50¢	Booker T. Washington Memorial half dollar	Booker T. Washington	Hall of Fame for Great Americans and a log cabin	90% Ag, 10% Cu	Authorized: 5,000,000 (max 1946-1951 total) Uncirculated: 12,004 (P); 12,004 D 512,091 S	1950		

== 1951 ==
=== Non-circulating coins ===
Face value	Coin	Obverse design	Reverse design	Composition	Mintage	Available	Obverse	Reverse
50¢	Booker T. Washington Memorial half dollar	Booker T. Washington	Hall of Fame for Great Americans and a log cabin	90% Ag, 10% Cu	Uncirculated: 510,082 (P); 12,004 D 12,004 S	1951		
50¢	Carver-Washington half dollar	George Washington Carver and Booker T. Washington	Map of the United States (Delaware was omitted)	90% Ag, 10% Cu	Authorized: 3,415,631 (max 1951–1954 total) Uncirculated: 110,018 (P); 10,004 D 10,004 S	1951		

== 1952 ==
=== Non-circulating coins ===
Face value	Coin	Obverse design	Reverse design	Composition	Mintage	Available	Obverse	Reverse
50¢	Carver-Washington half dollar	George Washington Carver and Booker T. Washington	Map of the United States (Delaware was omitted)	90% Ag, 10% Cu	Uncirculated: 2,006,292 (P); 8,006 D 8,006 S	1952		

== 1953 ==
=== Non-circulating coins ===
Face value	Coin	Obverse design	Reverse design	Composition	Mintage	Available	Obverse	Reverse
50¢	Carver-Washington half dollar	George Washington Carver and Booker T. Washington	Map of the United States (Delaware was omitted)	90% Ag, 10% Cu	Uncirculated: 8,003 (P); 8,003 D 108,020 S	1953		

== 1954 ==
=== Non-circulated coins ===
Face value	Coin	Obverse design	Reverse design	Composition	Mintage	Available	Obverse	Reverse
50¢	Carver-Washington half dollar	George Washington Carver and Booker T. Washington	Map of the United States (Delaware was omitted)	90% Ag, 10% Cu	Uncirculated: 12,006 (P); 12,006 D 122,024 S	1954		
50¢	Northampton, Massachusetts Tercentennial half dollar (vetoed)	Unknown	Unknown	90% Ag, 10% Cu	None authorized or minted (authorization of 1,000,000 was proposed)	Never available		
50¢	City of New York Tercentennial half dollar (vetoed)	Unknown	Unknown	90% Ag, 10% Cu	None authorized or minted (authorization of 5,000,000 was proposed)	Never available		
50¢	Louisiana Purchase Sesquicentennial half dollar (vetoed)	Unknown	Unknown	90% Ag, 10% Cu	None authorized or minted (authorization of 2,500,000 was proposed)	Never available		
