= Jackie Robinson commemorative coins =

1997 US commemorative coin series

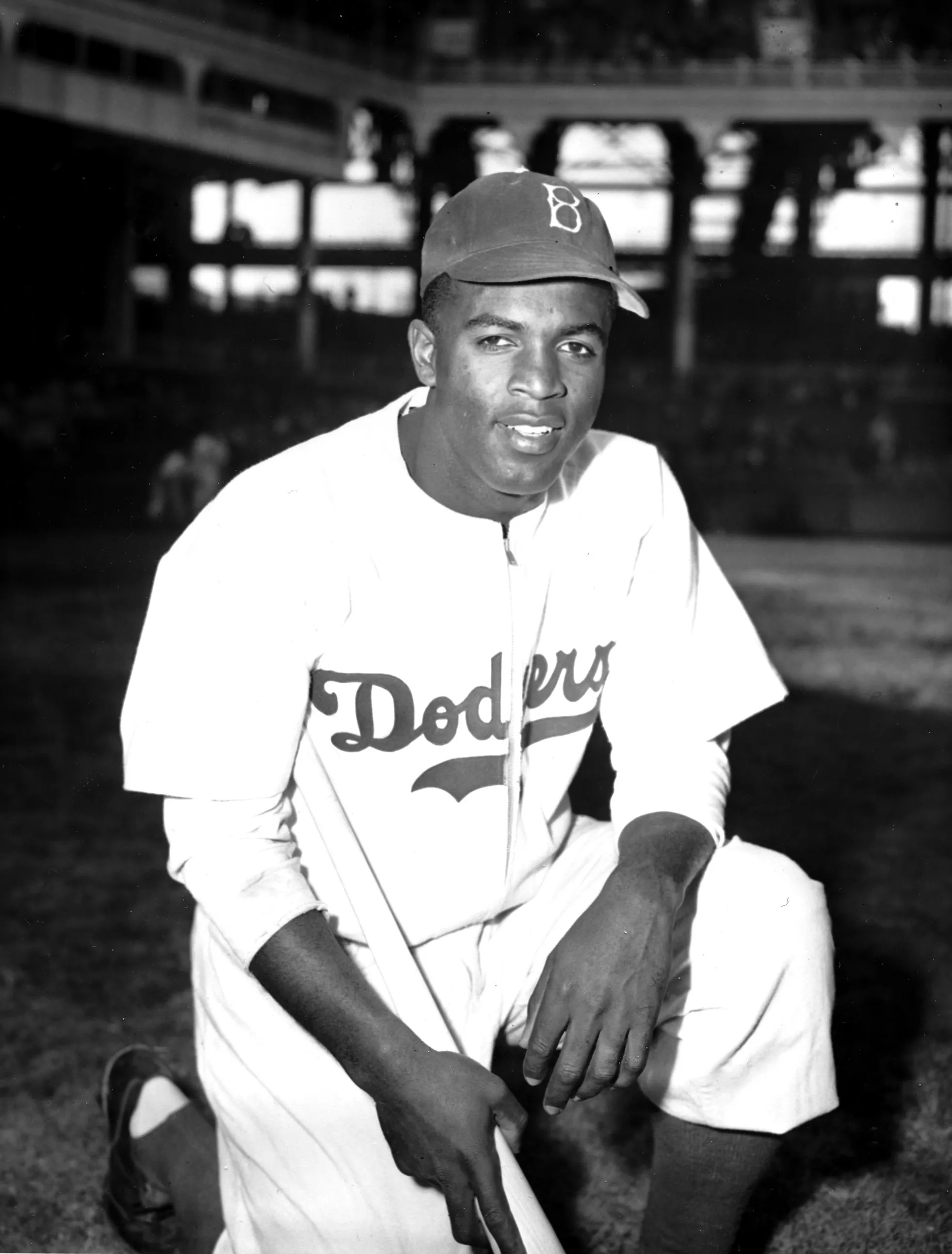
Jackie Robinson in 1947

The Jackie Robinson commemorative coins are a series of commemorative coins issued by the United States Mint in 1997 to commemorate the 50th anniversary of Jackie Robinson debuting in Major League Baseball and breaking the baseball color line. The series consists of silver dollars and gold half eagles ($5 coins). The obverse of the dollars depicts Robinson sliding into home plate and was designed by Alfred F. Maletsky. The reverse of the dollars depicts the logo of the Jackie Robinson Foundation and was designed by T. James Ferrell. The obverse of the half eagles depict a portrait of Robinson and was designed by William C. Cousins. The reverse of the half eagles depicts a baseball and was designed by James Peed.

The dollars were struck at the San Francisco Mint and the half eagles were struck at the West Point Mint in both proof and uncirculated condition condition. Although the Mint anticipated high sales, they failed to meet expectations. Surcharges for the coin were paid to the Jackie Robinson Foundation, although a portion was allocated to the National Fund for the United States Botanic Garden.

The commemorative coins were the first to depict a black American since the Carver-Washington half dollar in 1954. The uncirculated half eagle is considered a key date for coin collectors.

== Background ==
Jackie Robinson was born in Cairo, Georgia on January 31, 1919. His family later moved to California, and in high school Robinson's abilities as an athlete were praised. While attending UCLA Robinson lettered in baseball, basketball, football, and track and field. Robinson was prevented from pursuing a career in either professional baseball or football, as both were racially segregated during the 1930s and 1940s. In 1942, Robinson entered the United States Army. During an incident at Fort Hood he refused to be seated at the back of a bus and was court-martialed; he was acquitted and was honorably discharged.

Robinson played for the Kansas City Monarchs in 1945 in the Negro leagues before being recuited by Brooklyn Dodgers manager Branch Rickey to play in the Dodgers farm team, the Montreal Royals in 1946. Despite facing abuse and threats, Robinson became the first black major league baseball player on April 15, 1947, which ended the color barrier in baseball. Robinson was named the first MLB Rookie of the Year for 1947 and helped the Dodgers win the 1955 World Series. Robinson was inducted into the National Baseball Hall of Fame in 1962. He died in 1972. His number, 42, was retired across the MLB in 1997.

== Legislation ==
Representative Nancy Johnson of Connecticut introduced H.R. 1776 to the United States House of Representatives on June 7, 1996. The bill called for the United States Mint to strike coins to commemorate black soldiers who participated in the American Revolutionary War. H.R. 1776 was passed by the House alongside two other commemorative coin bills on September 17, 1996. Another bill, H.R. 4818, calling for commemorative coins to honor Jackie Robinson, was introduced in the House on September 14, 1996. In the United States Senate, H.R. 1776 was amended by Senator Al D'Amato of New York, with the help of Representative Mike Castle of Delaware, to become an omnibus bill authorizing several commemorative coin programs and feasibility study for a 50 State quarters program. The amended bill was passed by unanimous consent on October 3, 1996. The House approved the amended bill the next day. The amended version of the bill included H.R. 4818. The bill was enacted into law as the United States Commemorative Coin Act of 1996 on October 20, 1996, by President Bill Clinton. Among the commemorative coins authorized was a program allowing the Mint to strike 200,000 silver dollars and 100,000 gold half eagles in commemoration of the 50th anniversary of Jackie Robinson breaking the color barrier in Major League Baseball. The inclusion of the Robinson commemorative coins in the legislation was proposed by the Jackie Robinson Foundation, an organization founded by Robinson's widow Rachel Robinson that offers scholarships to poor youths.

Surcharges applied to the sale of the coins were to be paid to the Jackie Robinson Foundation after the sales covered the Mint's production expenses. They were $10 for the dollar coin and $35 for the half eagle coin. However, the surcharges from the first 100,000 silver dollars sold ($1 million of proceeds) were to be paid to the National Fund for the United States Botanic Garden, after a provision was added by Senator Bennett Johnston to the authorizing legislation. Johnston justified the provision as his wife, Mary Gunn, vice chairman of the National Fund, had spent years working for the Botanic Garden silver dollar to be authorized while the Jackie Robinson Foundation proposed the commemorative coins "at the 11th hour". Representative Castle, Senator D'Amato, and Rachel Robinson had opposed the provision, but they did not want to risk seeing the legislation killed.

== Designs ==
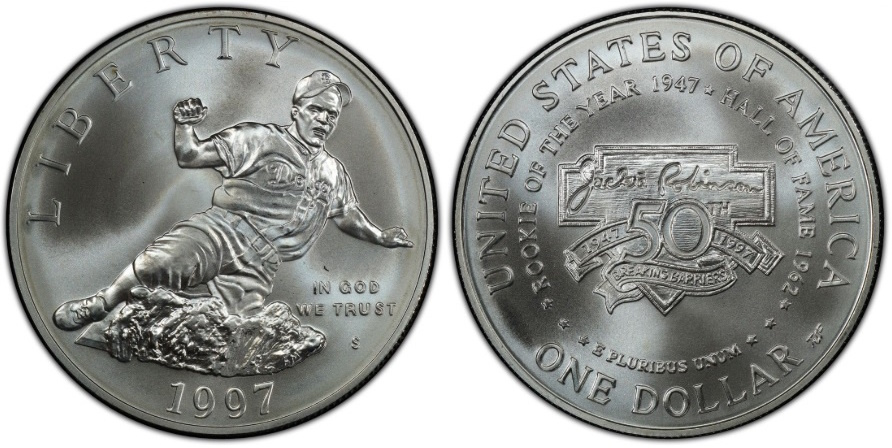
Jackie Robinson dollar coin

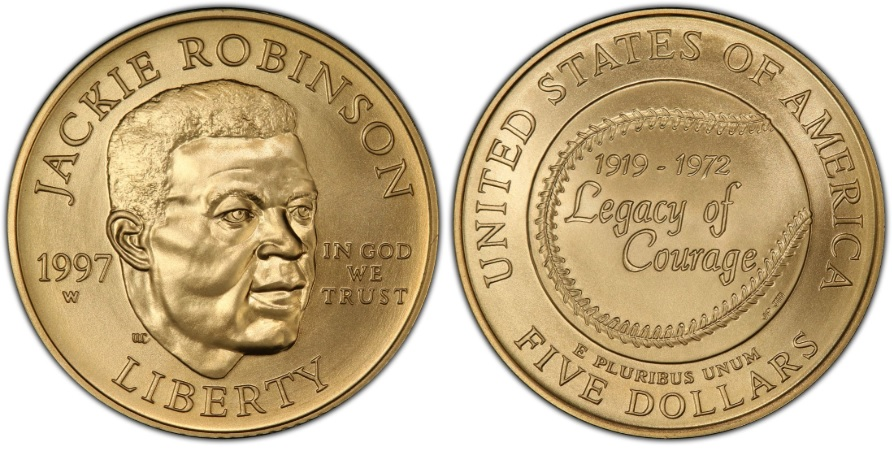
Jackie Robinson half eagle coin

The Mint presented proposed designs to the Commission of Fine Arts (CFA) during a meeting on March 20, 1997. The designs presented were those favored by Robinson's widow, Rachel Robinson, and the Jackie Robinson Foundation. The CFA approved the designs unanimously. The designs were shown at a Little League game honoring Robinson on April 13 in Union Township, New Jersey. The final designs were unveiled to Rachel and her family before a ceremony honoring Robinson at Shea Stadium on April 15.

=== Dollar ===
The obverse of the dollar was designed by Alfred F. Maletsky. It featured Robinson sliding into home plate and kicking up dust with the inscriptions LIBERTY arcing at the left, the date 1997 at the bottom and IN GOD WE TRUST at the right with the mint mark below. The design was compared to a play in the 1955 World Series where Robinson stole home plate. The reverse of the dollar was designed by T. James Ferrell. It depicts the 50th anniversary logo of the Jackie Robinson Foundation which was worn by players in the 1997 Major League Baseball season. The logo was surrounded by the inscriptions ROOKIE OF THE YEAR 1947, HALL OF FAME 1962, and E PLURIBUS UNUM in small letters around the logo and UNITED STATES OF AMERICA and ONE DOLLAR in large letters.

=== Half eagle ===
The obverse of the half eagle was designed by William C. Cousins and featured a portrait of Robinson with JACKIE ROBINSON inscribed above and LIBERTY below; the date and mint mark appear to the left and IN GOD WE TRUST appears to the right. The reverse was designed by James Peed and depicts a baseball inscribed with 1919–1972 and LEGACY OF COURAGE; around the baseball reads UNITED STATES OF AMERICA, ONE DOLLAR and E PLURIBUS UNUM.

== Production ==
The coins were minted in both proof and uncirculated condition. The dollar coins were composed of 90% silver and 10% copper and struck at the San Francisco Mint. The half eagles were composed of 90% gold and 10% copper and struck at the West Point Mint. A Mint report from July 1998 erroneously reported that 222,933 silver dollars and 48,500 half eagles had been struck.

Mintage figures of the Jackie Robinson commemorative coins
Coin	Pre-issue price	Issue price	Mint and mint mark	Authorized mintage	Total mintage
$5 proof	$195	$225	West Point (W)	100,000	24,072
$5 uncirculated	$180	$205	West Point (W)	100,000	5,174
$1 proof	$33	$37	San Francisco (S)	200,000	110,002
$1 uncirculated	$30	$32	San Francisco (S)	200,000	30,180

== Release and reception ==
Sales expectations were high, with the Foundation asking that the launch date of July 8 be moved earlier to April. The original authorizing legislation stated the coins could only be produced between July 1, 1997, and July 1, 1998. A July 1997 article in The Numismatist from Donn Pearlman claimed the coins were the first since the 1986 Statue of Liberty commemorative coins to "attract ongoing, widespread, positive publicity in the general news media." The commemorative coins were the first to depict a black American since the 1954 Carver-Washington half dollar, and the half eagle was the first United States gold coin to depict a black American.

The Mint offered a limited Jackie Robinson Legacy Set consisting of the proof half eagle coin, a reproduction of a 1952 Topps baseball card, a lapel pin, and a patch worn by players in the 1997 Major League Baseball season. Of the total mintage, 10,271 proof half eagles were sold as part of the Legacy Sets. Q. David Bowers noted that the baseball card was the first to be issued by the US government. Remaining unsold baseball cards were destroyed by the Mint. Two more sets were offered: one consisting of both the dollar and half eagle in proof condition and another consisting of the dollar and half eagle in both proof and uncirculated condition.

Sales of the coins failed to meet expectations. In a 2002 Coin World article, David Allen Hines attributed the failure to poor marketing to sports enthusiasts and coin collectors being disgusted at the release of another expensive set of coins. The Foundation sought to extend the sales of the coins to December 31, 1998, and lobbied Congress to pass legislation. The Senate passed an amendment to extend the sales period, but the bill died in the House after opposition from Representative Mike Castle. Later legislation was approved granting the extension as well allowing the Foundation to buy remaining unsold coins at a discount, with the costs of continuing the program coming from the surcharges. The Foundation decided against buying the remaining coins.

Due to its low sales, the uncirculated half eagle is considered rare and has been described as a key date for collectors of modern United States commemorative coins. Prices for the half eagles increased on the collector market, with an uncirculated example graded MS-69 by Professional Coin Grading Service selling for $2,185 at a March 2012 Heritage Auctions sale. Coins remain available on the secondary market.

A Congressional Gold Medal was posthumously awarded to Robinson in 2005; the Mint offered bronze replicas to the public.

== See also ==
- List of United States commemorative coins and medals (1990s)
- National Baseball Hall of Fame commemorative coins
- United States commemorative coins
