= Louis J. Winston =

Lawyer, policeman,port collector, landowner, and newspaper publisher in Mississippi

Louis J. Winston (1844–1918) was a lawyer, policeman, assessor, port collector, landowner, and newspaper publisher in Mississippi. He was born in Natchez, Mississippi. He published the Natchez Reporter from 1890 to 1909. He worked as a lawyer in Greenville, Mississippi.

A bronze bust of him by Isaac Scott Hathaway is atop his grave. A historical marker commemorates Winston's life.
