= National Law Enforcement Museum =

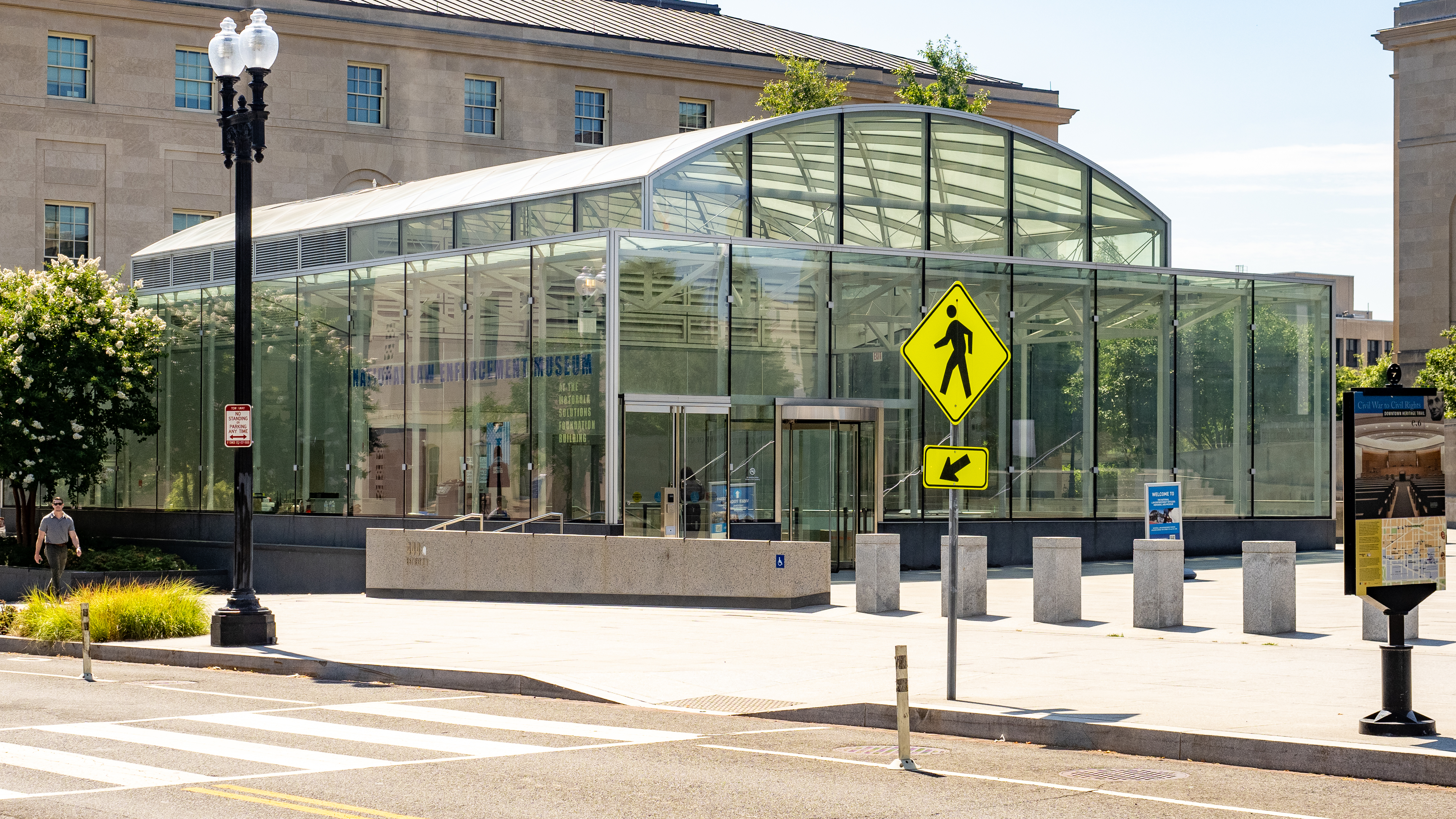
- Exterior in 2024

- Location within Washington, D.C.
- Established: October 13, 2018
- Location: 444 E St NW, Washington, D.C.
- Coordinates: 38.8967°N 77.0176°W
- Type: History museum
- Executive director: Thomas Canavan
- Public transit access: Judiciary Square
- Website: nleomf.org//

The National Law Enforcement Museum is a museum located in Washington, D.C. It opened on October 13, 2018, and covers American law enforcement through interactive exhibits, historical and contemporary artifact collections, with a dedicated space for research and educational programming. It is a mostly-underground facility located adjacent to the National Law Enforcement Officers Memorial in Washington, D.C.'s Judiciary Square near several district and federal courthouses.

== Design ==
The architect for the museum was Davis Buckley Architects and Planners, the firm that also designed the Memorial. The museum is composed of permanent galleries and one changing exhibitions gallery. The design of the permanent galleries was first undertaken by Christopher Chadbourne & Associates of Boston. When that firm closed, the design effort was completed by Studio 647 of Washington D.C. (exhibition design) and One By Design of Gloucester, MA (graphic design). Media elements were produced by Richard Lewis Media Group and Donna Lawrence Productions. The exhibits were built and installed by Design and Production Incorporated of Lorton, VA.

The building is located below ground with two entrance pavilions with 55,000 square feet (5,100 m^{2}) of interior space. The excavation for the building is 60 feet (18 m) below the surface.

== History ==
The design was completed in 1991 but the museum was not completed until 2018, pending funding and other hurdles. In 2000, the United States Congress authorized the establishment of the National Law Enforcement Museum, to tell the story of law enforcement in the United States. Stories of the fallen will be featured in the Museum's "Hall of Remembrance." The bill, S.1438, introduced by Senator Ben Nighthorse Campbell of Colorado was signed into law by President Bill Clinton on November 9, 2000, authorized the planning for the museum. The public review process to authorize construction at the site took five years.

On October 14, 2010, Attorney General Eric Holder, Homeland Security Secretary Janet Napolitano and others broke ground on the construction of the museum. As of October 2012, over $58 million in private donations have been raised.

On February 28, 2014, Rep. Steny Hoyer introduced the bill to amend the National Law Enforcement Museum Act to extend the termination date (H.R. 4120; 113th Congress) into the United States House of Representatives. The bill was signed on May 16, 2014, and extended until November 9, 2016, the authority of the National Law Enforcement Officers Memorial Fund, a nonprofit organization, to construct a museum on federal lands within the District of Columbia honoring law enforcement officers.

The museum opened October 18, 2018. In 2019, Bloomberg Businessweek reported that the museum defaulted the $103 million it borrowed in 2016. After the default, there have been no repayments made by the museum, and the outstanding debt is still reflected on its latest financial statement from 2020.

Due to the pandemic, the museum closed temporarily to the public on March 15, 2020. During this time, the museum served the public through online educational programs. The museum reopened on August 27, 2021, after being closed for 18 months.

== Collection ==
The museum's collections include:

- The U.S. Park Police Bell 206 Eagle 1 helicopter that responded to the Air Florida Flight 90 crash into the Potomac River
- A costume from the 1987 film RoboCop
- A sweat shirt worn by character Jack Bauer in the TV series 24
- Artifacts of FBI Director J. Edgar Hoover
- DC Sniper Task Force evidence related to the investigation and trial of the Beltway sniper attacks of October 2002
- Memorabilia related to the prohibition-era federal agent Eliot Ness and his team of "Untouchables"
- Handcuffs used by the police to arrest Sirhan Sirhan, after the latter fatally shot US Senator and presidential candidate Robert F. Kennedy in June 1968 at the Ambassador Hotel in Los Angeles
- Badge, gun and a coin purse belonging to American Old West lawman Pat Garrett who became famous for killing frontier outlaw Billy the Kid in 1881
- Badge and Deputy US Marshal commission that belonged to Ted Hinton-the youngest of the posse that ambushed and killed fugitive couple Bonnie and Clyde near Gibsland, Louisiana, on May 23, 1934
- Bulletproof vest from c.1930 that was used by gangster Al Capone
- An Indiana State Police car
- Michael K. Neal's Pickup truck

== Exhibitions ==
=== Permanent ===
- Being an Officer explores all the different jobs law enforcement officers do to keep communities safe. Includes information about specialized law enforcement roles including SWAT, corrections, bomb squad, covert ops, and K9.
- Dial 911 invites visitors to take on the vital role of a 9-1-1 Emergency Operator in this interactive exhibit by answering calls, assessing the situation, and dispatching officers. Visitors can listen to recordings of real 9-1-1 calls
- History Time Capsules showcase historical artifacts from the Museum's collections. Visitors can learn about law enforcement officers across all eras of American history, including colonial days, the Wild West, the Prohibition Era, the Civil Rights movement, and into the modern day.
- History Beat highlights six iconic objects from the Museum's collection and are paired with multimedia presentations to dive deep into important stories in law enforcement history.
- Officers’ Stories share first-hand accounts of what life is like on the job. From the ordinary to the extraordinary, these brief, true stories capture memorable moments that give insight into the individual officers and the work of law enforcement.
- Reel to Real display mementos of law enforcement in pop culture, including toys, props, and memorabilia from some of the most iconic cop shows and movies over the years. The two-part exhibit also features the short film A Cop and an Actor Walk into a Bar where actor Vincent D'Onofrio and Boston (MA) Police Commissioner (ret.) William Gross discuss some of the iconic moments for law enforcement on the screen.
- Take the Case allows visitors to simultaneously play the roles of forensic scientist and detective as they collect evidence, examine clues, and learn about what it takes to build a case using modern investigation techniques.
- Tools of the Trade explores all the gear and equipment an officer may need to use on the job. Visitors can learn how officers use their equipment and how those tools have changed over time.
- To Serve and Protect highlights how officers work within their communities by sharing first person accounts of 9/11, the aftermath of the AME Church shooting in Charleston, South Carolina, and the Air Florida Flight 90 rescue. This exhibit also features the Web of Law Enforcement, an interactive display inviting visitors to choose from 60 recent criminal cases that have taken place throughout the United States. Visitors can then follow the case from start to finish.
- Hall of Remembrance features the names and photographs of officers added to the National Law Enforcement Officers Memorial for the current year. Visitors can also learn about the founding of the Memorial, National Police Week, and the ongoing effort to honor the fallen.

=== Temporary ===
- Post 9/11: The Evolution of American Law Enforcement focuses on the significant changes to U.S. Law Enforcement that occurred in the aftermath of the 9/11 attacks.

=== Digital ===
- Five Communities began as an exhibit in the Museum's DuPont Gallery and has now been adapted for the web. Learn about different approaches to community engagement and outreach through the stories of five police departments across the US.

== Reception ==
A review by The Washington Post in 2019 acknowledged the Law Enforcement Museum's value in presenting the perspective of police officers, but described its "focus on the dramatic and violent aspects of law enforcement seems to spill into glamorization at times". The review also criticized the exhibits for lacking context, which it said causes the museum to "leans more toward propaganda than education". In particular, the museum's exhibit about the 2014 shooting of Michael Brown was characterized as a "missed educational opportunity" to mention the ensuing protests or "continuing problem of police violence in black communities".
