= Franklin Delano Roosevelt half eagle =

1997 commemorative coin

Franklin Delano Roosevelt gold $5
- United States
- Value: $5 U.S. dollars
- Mass: 8.359 g (0.27 troy oz)
- Diameter: 21.59 mm (.850 in)
- Edge: Reeded
- Composition: 90% Au; 6% Ag; 4% Cu
- Gold: 0.24 troy oz
- Years of minting: 1997
- Mint marks: W

Obverse
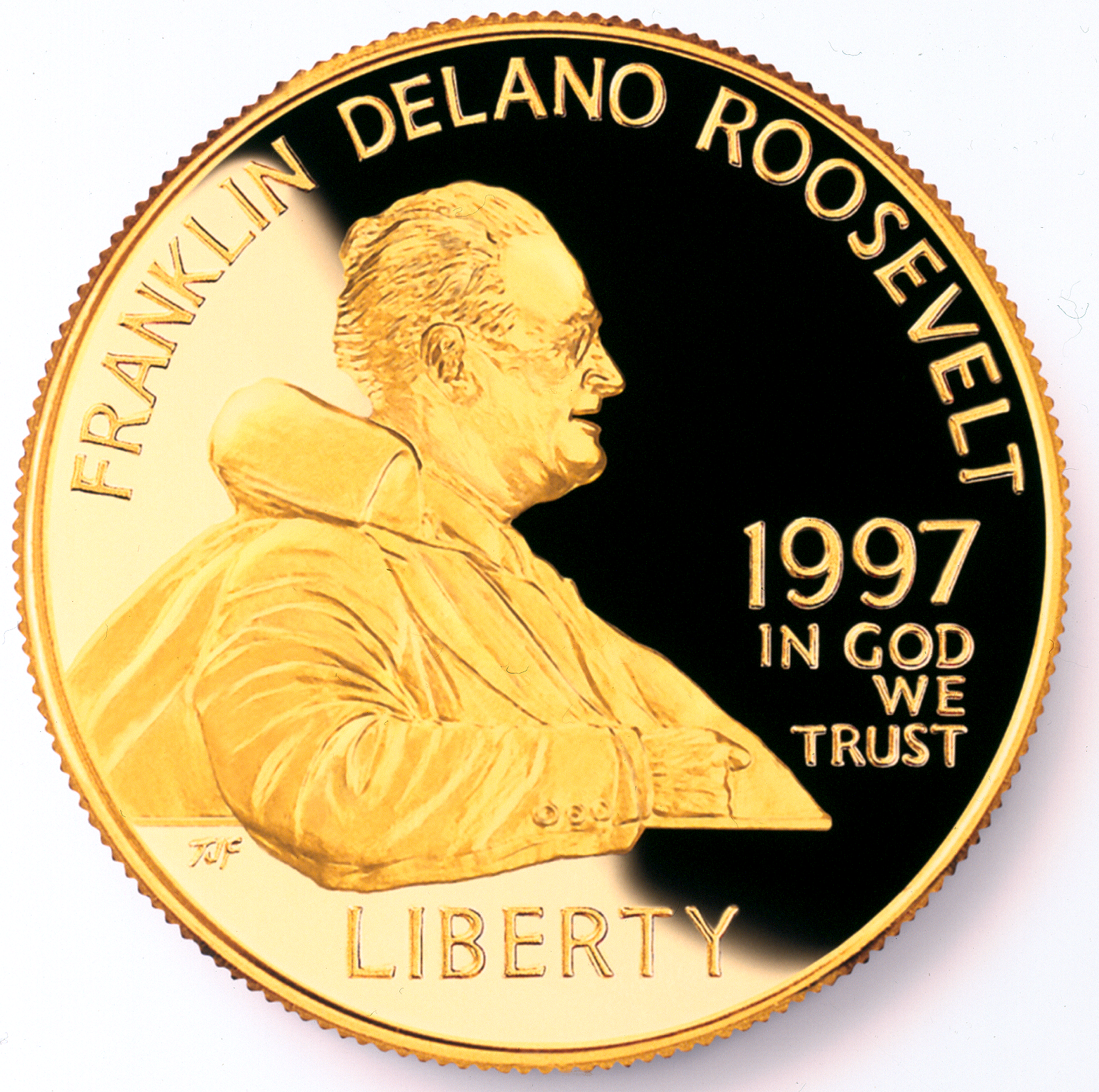
- Design: Profile of President Roosevelt
- Designer: T. James Ferrell

Reverse
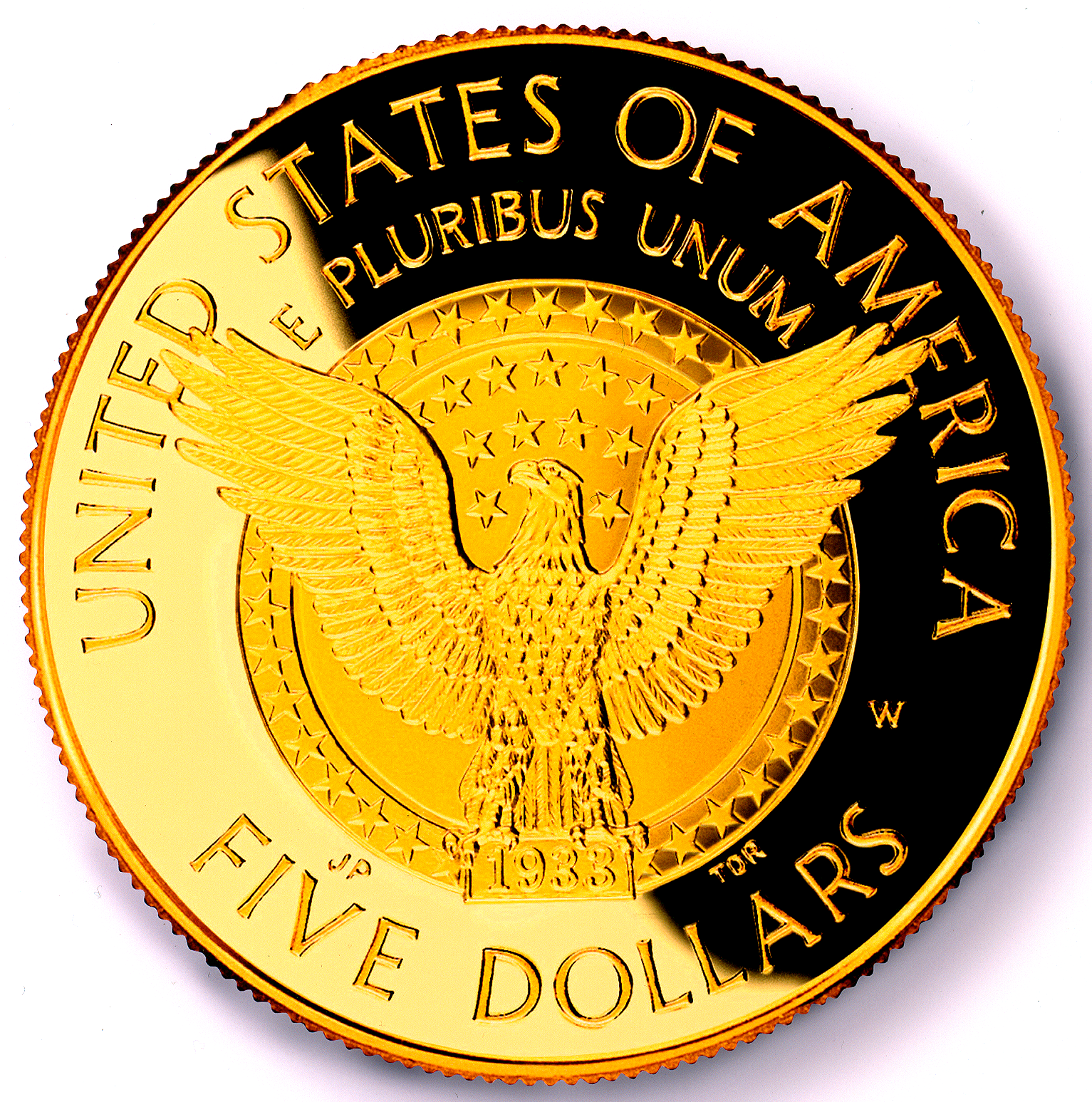
- Design: Presidential seal displayed at FDR's 1933 inauguration
- Designer: James Peed

The Franklin Delano Roosevelt gold half eagle is a commemorative coin issued by the United States Mint in 1997.

== Legislation ==
The United States Commemorative Coin Act of 1996 (Pub. L. 104–329 (text) (PDF)) authorized the production of a commemorative $5 gold coin (half eagle) to commemorate the public opening of the Franklin Delano Roosevelt Memorial in Washington, DC. The act allowed the coins to be struck in both proof and uncirculated finishes.

== Design ==
The obverse of the Franklin Delano Roosevelt gold half eagle, designed by T. James Ferrell, is based on one of FDR's favorite photographs taken in 1938 depicting the commander-in-chief on the bridge of the USS Houston wearing a boat cloak that became a familiar trademark for many Americans. The reverse, designed by James Peed, features a rendering of the Presidential seal displayed at FDR's 1933 inaugural.

== Specifications ==
- Display Box Color: Maroon
- Edge: Reeded
- Weight: 8.359 grams; 0.27 troy ounce
- Diameter: 21.59 millimeters; 0.850 inch
- Composition: 90% Gold, 6% Silver, 4% Copper

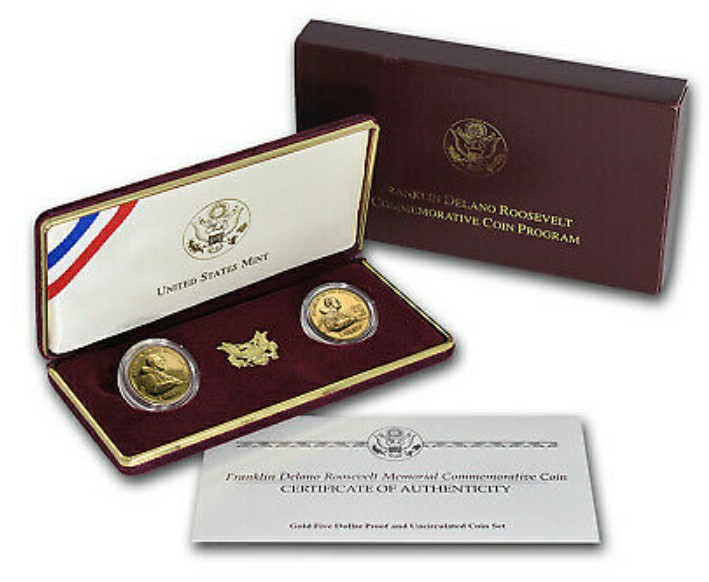
Franklin Delano Roosevelt $5 gold uncirculated and proof coins with Mint packaging and COA

== See also ==
- List of United States commemorative coins and medals (1990s)
- United States commemorative coins
- United States Commemorative Coin Act of 1996
