= Yellowstone National Park silver dollar =

United States commemorative coin

Yellowstone National Park Commemorative Dollar
- United States
- Value: 1 U.S. Dollar
- Mass: 26.73 g
- Diameter: 38.10 mm (1.500 in)
- Edge: Reeded
- Composition: 90% Ag; 10% Cu
- Years of minting: 1999

Obverse
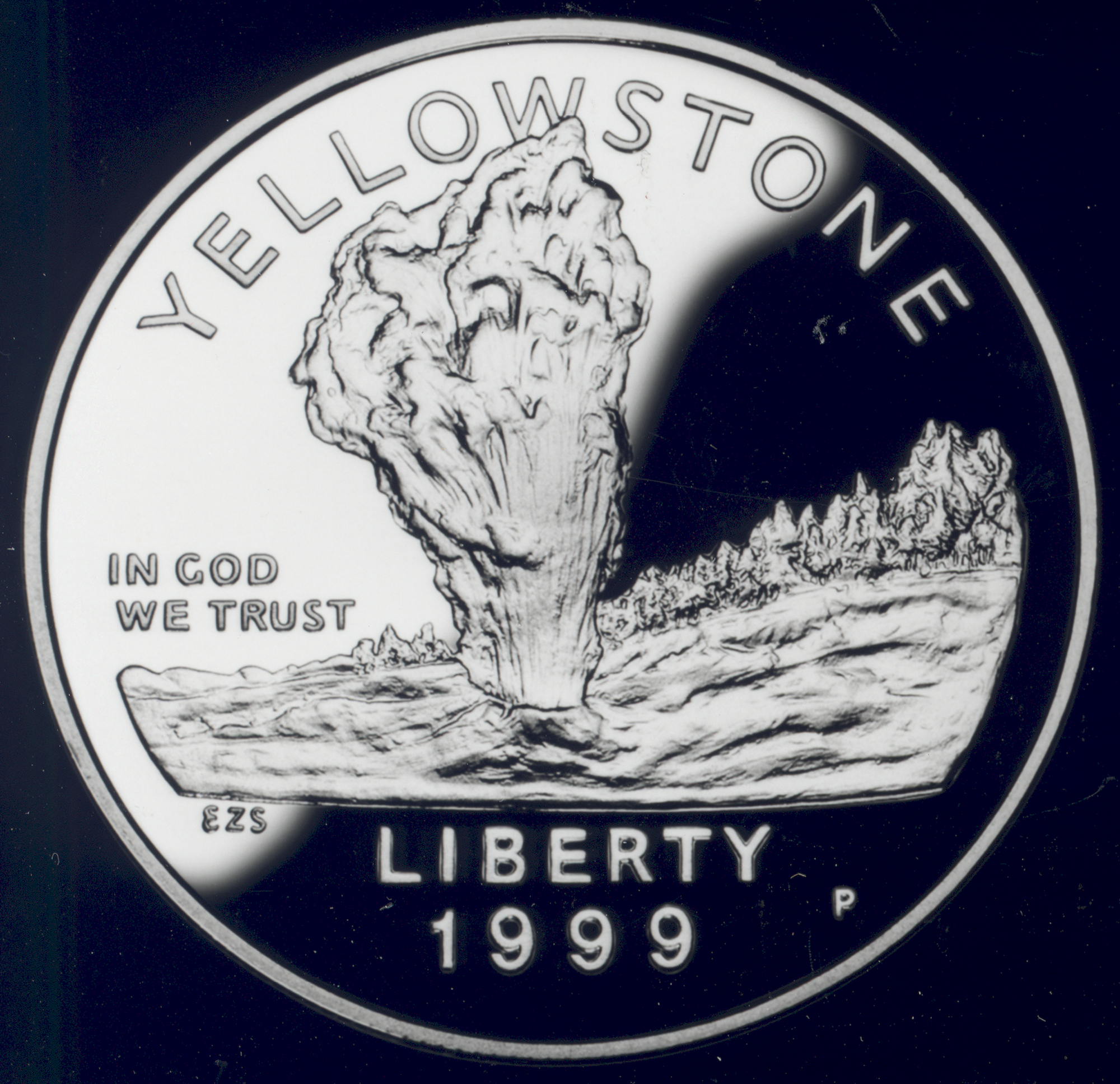
- Design: A spouting geyser with background treeline
- Designer: Edgar Z. Steever, IV
- Design date: 1999

Reverse
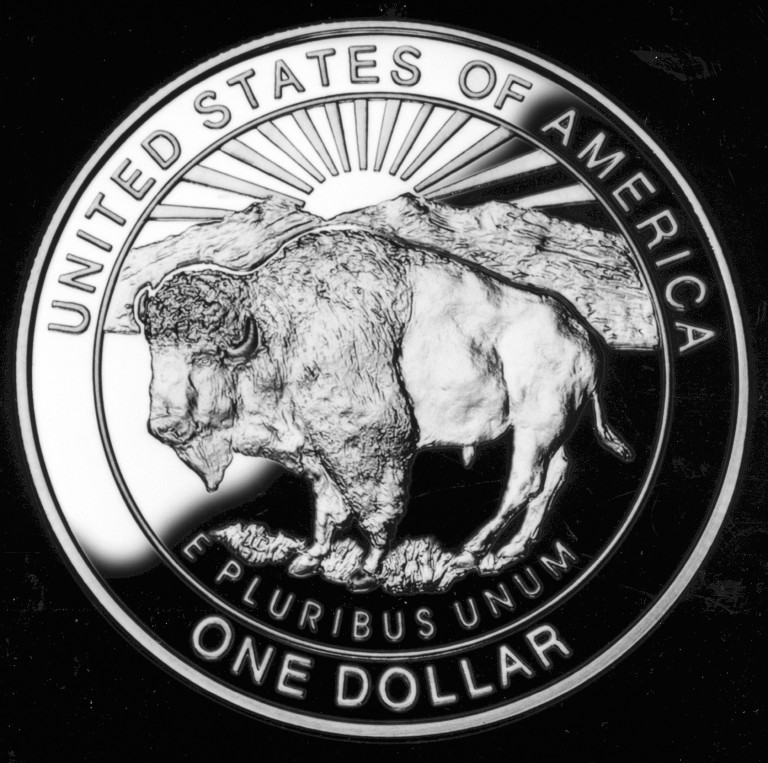
- Design: American Buffalo with sun and mountains in the background
- Designer: William C. Cousins
- Design date: 1999

The Yellowstone National Park silver dollar is a commemorative coin issued by the United States Mint in 1999. Proceeds benefitted Yellowstone National Park and other national parks via the National Park Foundation.

== Legislation ==
The United States Commemorative Coin Act of 1996 (Pub. L. 104–1776 (text) (PDF)) authorized the production of a commemorative silver dollar to commemorate the 125th anniversary of the establishment of Yellowstone National Park, the nation's first. The act allowed the coins to be struck in both proof and uncirculated finishes. The coins were first released on July 16, 1999.

== Design ==
The obverse of the Yellowstone National Park commemorative dollar, designed by Edgar Z. Steever, IV, depicts a spouting geyser with the park's tree-lined landscape in the background. The reverse, designed by William C. Cousins, is adapted from the seal of the U.S. Department of Interior and shows an American Buffalo on the plains with a sun rising above the mountains in the background.

== Specifications ==
- Display Box Color: Dark Green
- Edge: Reeded
- Weight: 26.730 grams; 0.8594 troy ounce
- Diameter: 38.10 millimeters; 1.500 inches
- Composition: 90% Silver, 10% Copper

== See also ==
- List of United States commemorative coins and medals (1990s)
- United States commemorative coins
- United States Commemorative Coin Act of 1996
