= Booker T. Washington National Monument =

224 acres managed the U.S. National Park Service

- U.S. National Register of Historic Places
- U.S. Historic district
- U.S. National Monument
- Virginia Landmarks Register
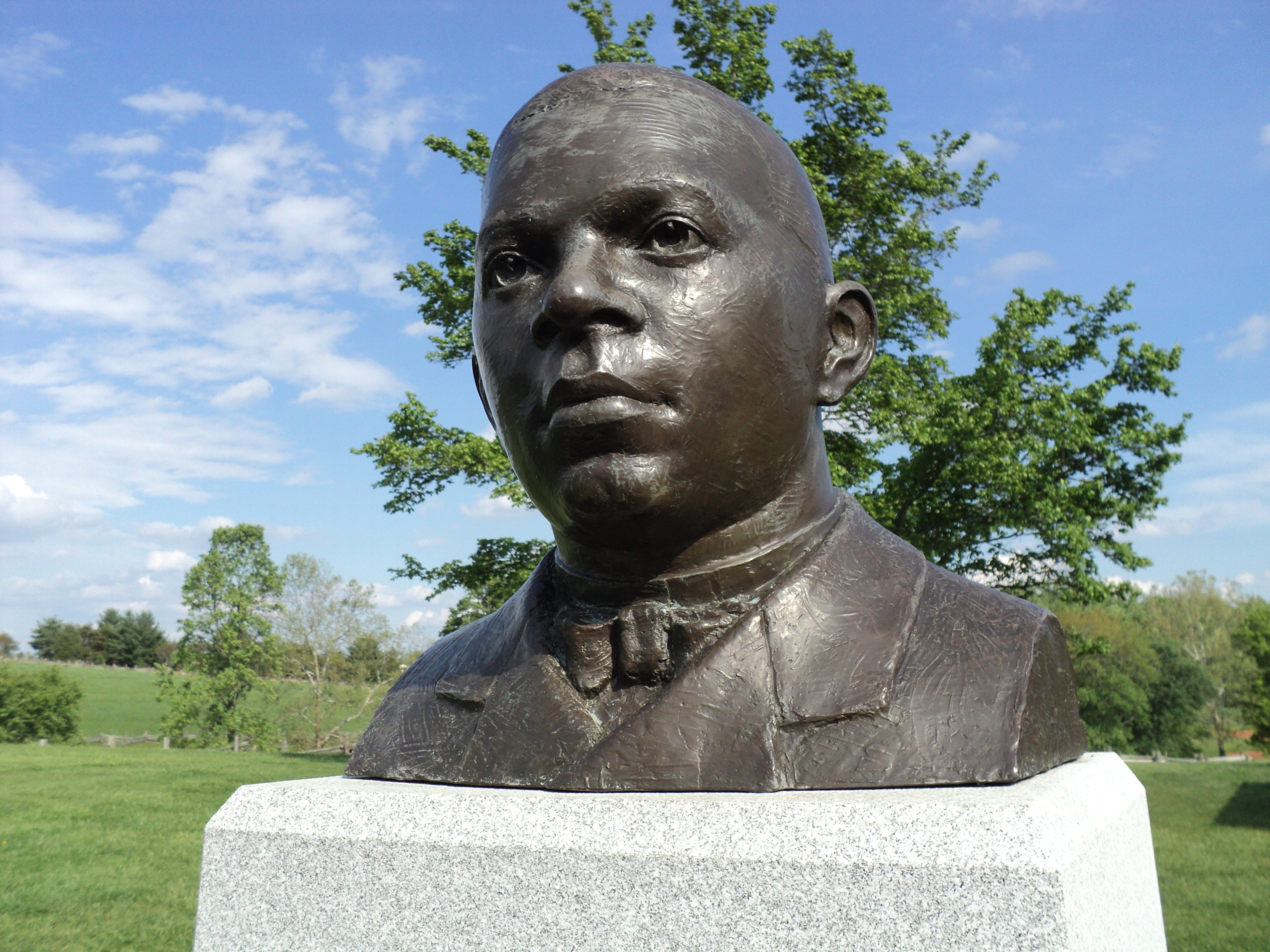
- Bust of Booker T. Washington by James Barnhill, Booker T. Washington National Monument

- Location within Virginia Location within the United States
- Interactive map of Booker T. Washington National Monument
- Location: Franklin County, Virginia, United States
- Nearest city: Rocky Mount, Virginia
- Coordinates: 37°7′10.58″N 79°43′53.45″W
- Area: 198.8 acres (80.5 ha)
- Built: 1956
- Visitation: 21,698 (2025)
- Website: Booker T. Washington National Monument
- NRHP reference No.: 66000834
- VLR No.: 033-0001

Significant dates
- Added to NRHP: October 15, 1966
- Designated NMON: April 2, 1956
- Designated VLR: January 16, 1973

The Booker T. Washington National Monument is a National Monument near the community of Hardy, Virginia, and is located entirely in rural Franklin County, Virginia. It preserves portions of the 207-acre (0.90 km^{2}) tobacco farm on which educator and leader Booker T. Washington was born into slavery on April 5, 1856. It provides interpretation of Washington's life and achievements, as well as interpretation of 1850s chattel slavery and farming through the use of buildings, gardens, crafts and animals.

Congress authorized the Booker T. Washington Memorial half dollar to fund the purchase of the site. This commemorative half dollar was the first US coin to feature an African American, and was minted from 1946 to 1951 at three different mints. 18 varieties of the coin were produced, and more than 1.5 million were sold (primarily to collectors). Yet, after the coin's production was finished, the BTW Commission owed more money than it had assets, and the Commonwealth of Virginia had to step in to provide funds to purchase the site.

The site was listed on the National Register of Historic Places in 1966 and designated a National Monument on April 2, 1956.

== See also ==
- Hale's Ford, Virginia
- Tuskegee University
- List of national monuments of the United States
