= United States Commemorative Coin Act of 1996 =

United States federal law

- 104th United States Congress

Congress
- Citation: Public Law 104-329; 110 Stat. 4008; 31 United States Code 5101 to 5112
- Enacted by: Congress
- Enacted: October 4, 1996
- Signed: October 20, 1996

Legislative history
- Bill title: H.R. 1776
- Introduced by: Nancy Johnson
- Introduced: June 7, 1995

Amended by
- S.Amdt. 5428

Summary
- An Act to establish a United States commemorative coin programs, and for other purposes.

The United States Commemorative Coin Act of 1996 (Pub. L. 104–329 (text) (PDF)) is a United States federal law which established a commemorative coin program within the United States Mint in 1996. In addition, the law specifically authorized commemorative coins to observe the 150th anniversary of the death of Dolley Madison, to honor George Washington, the 125th anniversary of the establishment Yellowstone National Park, and the 50th anniversary of Jackie Robinson's racial desegregation of Major League Baseball. It also established commemorative coin fundraising programs for the Black Revolutionary War Patriots Memorial, Franklin Delano Roosevelt Memorial, and National Law Enforcement Officers Memorial.

Title II of the act established a fund for the National Law Enforcement Officers Memorial Maintenance Fund. The goal of the fund was to maintain the memorial, add names to it as warranted, and to establish a scholarship program for family members of law enforcement officers killed in the line of duty. Title III of the act established a program to study whether a commemorative coin program should be established to honor all 50 U.S. states.

== Legislative history ==
The first commemorative coin authorized by Congress was the George Washington 250th Anniversary silver half-dollar, released in 1982. By the mid-1990s, however, an ever-growing number of groups were pressing Congress to authorize more commemorative coins, even though no official mechanism for their design, minting, and sales existed within the United States Treasury.

H.R. 1776 was introduced in the United States House of Representatives on June 7, 1995 by Representative Nancy Johnson (R-Connecticut). H.R. 1776 created a commemorative coin program at the U.S. Mint whose purpose was to help regulate the numerous requests for commemorative coins received by Congress each year. The legislation regulated the coin program It was referred to the House Committee on Banking and Financial Services.

Two related bills were also introduced in the House. The first was the Dolley Madison Commemorative Coin Act (H.R. 1684), introduced on May 23, 1995, by Representative Thomas J. Bliley, Jr. (R-Virginia). The second was the George Washington Commemorative Coin Act (H.R. 2026), introduced on July 13, 1995, by Representative Thomas M. Davis (R-Virginia).

The Johnson bill lay in committee until September 1996. The Dolley Madison and George Washington commemorative coin bills were merged into H.R. 1776 in subcommittee, and commemorative coin programs the Jackie Robinson, Yellowstone National Park, the Roosevelt Memorial, and the Law Enforcement Officers Memorial added as well. By the time the Subcommittee on Domestic and International Monetary Policy favorably forwarded the bill to the full committee, H.R. 1776 had more than 318 co-sponsors in the House. Since more than 90 percent of the members of the House supported the legislation, the bill was called for a vote on the House floor on the evening of September 17, 1996, and it passed by voice vote.

H.R. 1776 was considered by the United States Senate on October 3, 1996. (There were no committee hearings.) Senator Alfonse D'Amato offered an amendment (S. Amdt. 5428) which added the Black Revolutionary War Patriots Memorial to those commemorative coin programs authorized by the bill. The Senate agreed to the amendment by unanimous consent. The amended bill then passed the Senate with unanimous consent. On October 4, the House agreed by unanimous consent to the Senate bill. President Bill Clinton signed the measure into law on October 20, 1996.

== About the Commemorative Coin Act ==
Title I of the act established the Commemorative Coin Program within the United States Treasury. The United States Mint was directed to mint the following coins:

- Dolley Madison: 500,000 silver coins with a face value of $1 and a surcharge of $10 per coin.
- George Washington: 100,000 gold coins with a face value of $5 and a surcharge of $35 per coin.
- Black Revolutionary War Patriots Memorial: 500,000 silver coins with a face value of $1 and a surcharge of $10 per coin.
- Franklin Delano Roosevelt Memorial: 100,000 gold coins with a face value of $5 and a surcharge of $35 per coin.
- Yellowstone National Park: 500,000 silver coins with a face value of $1 and a surcharge of $10 per coin.
- National Law Enforcement Officers Memorial: 500,000 silver coins with a face value of $1 and a surcharge of $10 per coin.
- Jackie Robinson: 100,000 gold coins with a face value of $5 and a surcharge of $35 per coin and 200,000 silver coins with a face value of $1 and a surcharge of $10 per coin.

All commemorative coins were legal tender. Each commemorative coin was designed to raise money for a cause specified in the act. The U.S. Mint was authorized to sell the coins at a price that included its face value, the surcharge, the cost of designing and minting the coin, and the cost of shipping and handling.

Title II of the act created the National Law Enforcement Officers Memorial Maintenance Fund. The purpose of the fund was six-fold:

1. To provide for the maintenance and repair of the National Law Enforcement Officers Memorial;
2. To fund the addition to the memorial of the names of law enforcement officers who died in the line of duty;
3. To pay for security at the memorial site;
4. To provide funds, at the discretion of the federal government, to other organizations so that they may provide educational scholarships to family members of law enforcement officers killed in the line of duty;
5. To promote public awareness about the memorial; and
6. To pay for administration of the fund.

Title III of the act required the United States Secretary of the Treasury to study of the feasibility of a commemorative coin program honoring each of the 50 states. Title III provided that, should the study affirm the feasibility of such a program, the program would automatically commence to mint silver coins with a face value of 25 cents. The number of each coin to be minted was at the discretion of the Secretary of the Treasury.

Title III, Section 303 provided for terms for members of the Citizens Commemorative Coin Advisory Committee, while Title III, Section 304 provided for changes to staffing of regional mints.

=== Administration ===
Congress authorized 57 commemorative coin programs through calendar 2014. Surcharges from the sale of commemorative coins raised more than $484.9 million fiscal year ending on September 30, 2010.

On April 23, 2003, President George W. Bush signed into law the American 5-cent Coin Design Continuity Act (Public Law 108-15). Title II of the act amended the United States Commemorative Coin Act of 1996. Organizations receiving funds from the sale of United States Mint commemorative coins were now required to raise private additional funds equal to the amount received from the United States Treasury. Any funds not so matched would be returned to the Treasury. A recipient organization has two years from the end of the program to meet the matching funds requirement. In fiscal 2013 alone, the U.S. Mint turned over $5 million in unclaimed surcharge income to the U.S. Treasury after recipients were unable to raise the matching funds.

== Bibliography ==
- United States Mint (July 27, 2011). Commemorative Coin Reform Act Report to Congress: Fiscal Year (FY) 2011 First Quarter, October 1–December 31, 2010 (Report). Washington, D.C.: U.S. Mint.
- United States Mint (2014). 2013 Annual Report (PDF) (Report). Washington, D.C.: U.S. Mint. Archived from the original (PDF) on March 11, 2014.
