= National Law Enforcement Officers Memorial silver dollar =

1997 U.S. commemorative coin

National Law Enforcement Officers Memorial dollar
- United States
- Value: 1 U.S. Dollar
- Mass: 26.730 g
- Diameter: 38.1 mm
- Thickness: 2.58 mm
- Edge: Reeded
- Composition: 90% Ag / 10% Cu
- Years of minting: 1997
- Mintage: 28,575 Uncirculated 110,428 Proof
- Mint marks: P

Obverse
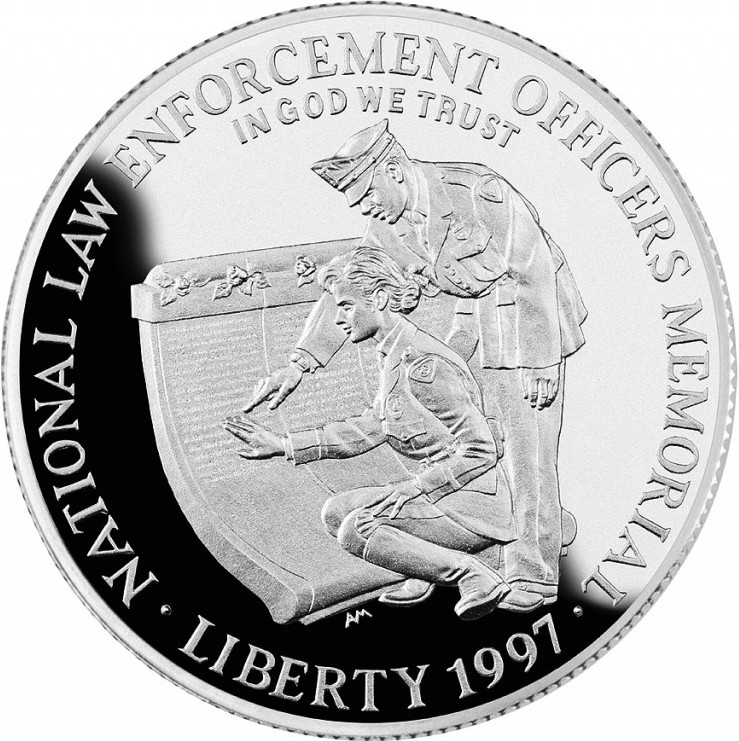
- Design: Two U.S. Park Police officers touching a fellow officer's name on the memorial
- Designer: Alfred F. Maletsky
- Design date: 1997

Reverse
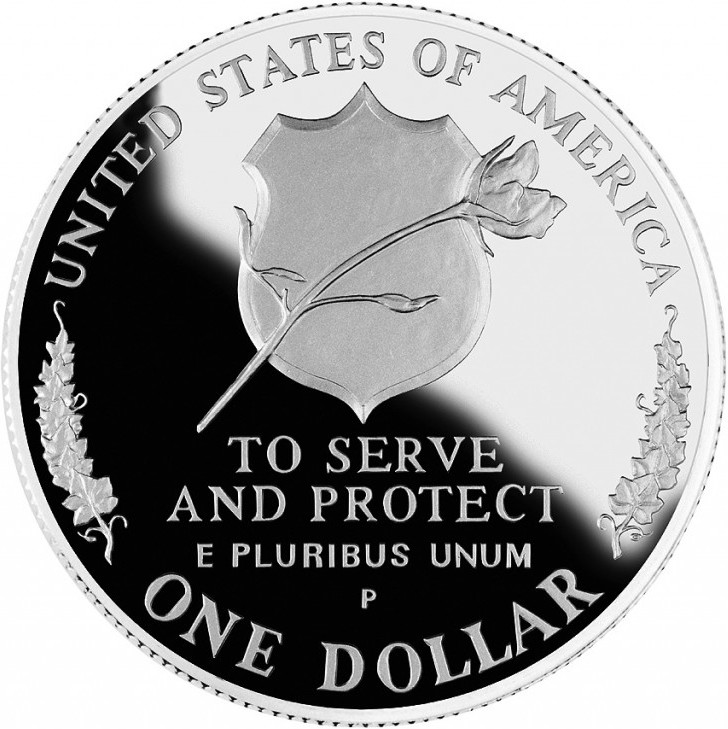
- Design: Unadorned shield with rose across it
- Designer: Alfred F. Maletsky
- Design date: 1997

The National Law Enforcement Officers Memorial silver dollar is a commemorative coin issued by the United States Mint in 1997. The coin commemorates the National Law Enforcement Officers Memorial in Washington, D.C., which honors U.S. law enforcement officers who have died in the line of duty. Surcharges from the coin were donated to a fund to help with the preservation of the memorial, which had opened in 1991. The memorial was commemorated again with the National Law Enforcement Memorial and Museum commemorative coins in 2021.

== Legislation ==
The United States Commemorative Coin Act of 1996 (Pub. L. 104–329 (text) (PDF)) was enacted on October 20, 1996, which authorized the production of several commemorative coins, including the National Law Enforcement Officers Memorial dollar, and established the National Law Enforcement Officers Memorial Maintenance Fund for the preservation of the memorial. A $10 surcharge on each coin sold was to be donated to the fund.

== Design ==
The obverse of the coin was inspired by a photograph, taken by Larry Ruggieri, of United States Park Police officers Robert Chelsey and Kelcy Stefansson making a rubbing of a fellow officer's name. This makes the commemorative coin one of the few where the figures depicted can be identified by name. The reverse depicts a solitary rose across an unadorned shield, representing the sacrifices made by officers, with the legend "To Serve and Protect". The obverse and reverse were both engraved by Mint engraver Alfred F. Maletsky.

== Production and release ==
Uncirculated and proof strikes of the coin were minted at the Philadelphia Mint. Only 139,003 coins, around a quarter of the maximum authorized mintage of 500,000, were sold, with 28,575 uncirculated pieces struck and 110,428 proof pieces struck. A special Insignia set including a proof coin, an enamel pin, and an embroidered emblem was sold alongside the regular issues. Sales of the coin raised $1.4 million for the maintenance fund, which had before been mostly funded by private donations.

Numismatist Q. David Bowers called the coin "numismatically meaningless" when explaining the coin's poor sales figures. The coin is popular with law enforcement officers, as the coin is often presented at retirement ceremonies. Due to this and the low mintages, the coin has higher prices than other modern commemorative dollars on the collector market.

== See also ==
- List of United States commemorative coins and medals (1990s)
- United States commemorative coins
