= Missouri Historical Society =

Historical organization in US

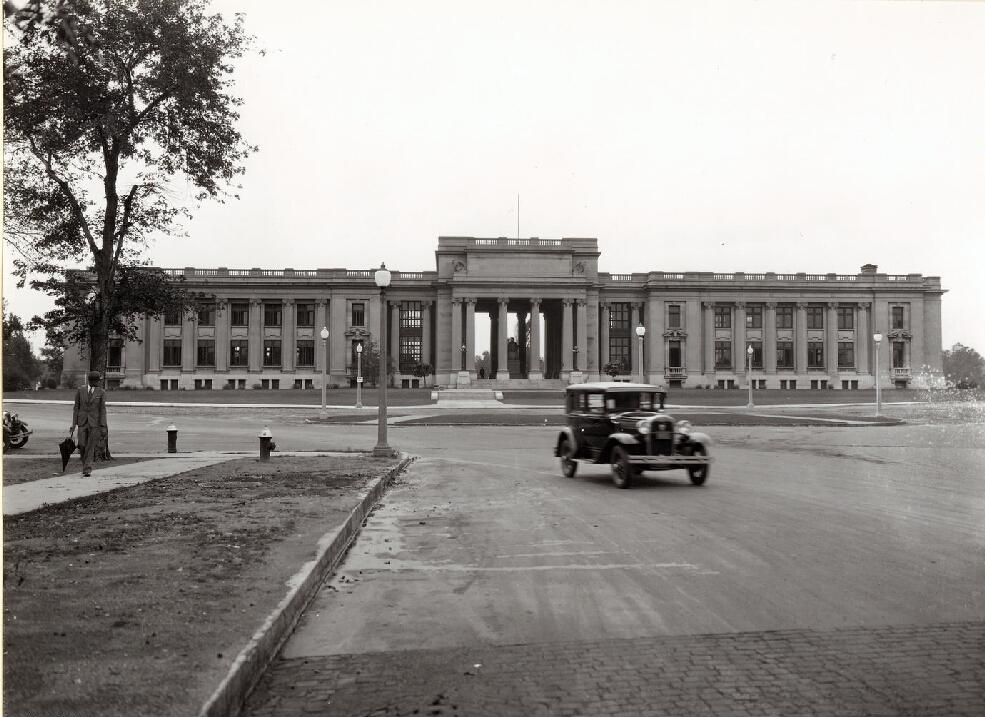
The Jefferson Memorial Building on 25 September 1930 after the completion of construction for the River des Peres Sewerage and Drainage Project in the area. This building was intended to store the archives of the Louisiana Purchase Exposition Company, the collection of the Missouri Historical Society, and historical artifacts associated with the territory the U.S. acquired in the Louisiana Purchase.

The Missouri Historical Society was founded in St. Louis on August 11, 1866. Founding members created the historical society "for the purpose of saving from oblivion the early history of the city and state".

== Organization ==
The Missouri Historical Society operates the Missouri History Museum in St. Louis' Forest Park, as well as the Library and Research Center. Admission to the museum and library are free to the public.

=== Library and Research Center ===
The Library and Research Center houses a regional history collection documenting St. Louis, the Mississippi and Missouri Valleys, the Louisiana Purchase Territory, and the American West. The Library and Research Center collections include:

- Library Collections
- Manuscript Collections
- Photographs and Prints
- Architecture Collections
- Broadcast Media Archives
- Museum Collections

No appointment is needed to view the library and manuscript collections, but is required for other collections. Among its unique collections are the 301 freedom suits of the 19th-century St. Louis Circuit Court Records, the largest group of such case files in the country. These have been scanned into a searchable database that is online for researchers. They document the slaves' petitions for freedom under state law before the American Civil War.

The research library is housed in a historic 1927 Byzantine revival synagogue building erected by the United Hebrew Congregation on Skinker Boulevard. (The congregation has moved to Chesterfield where it erected a new building.)

== Programming ==
The Missouri Historical Society offers programs and outreach services, including traveling exhibitions, tours, theatrical and musical presentations, programs for school classes and youth groups, family festivals, special events, workshops, and lectures.

== History ==
In 1952, the Missouri Historical Society was involved in efforts to lobby the U.S. government to create commemorative coins for the 150th anniversary of the Louisiana Purchase.
