= Isaac Scott Hathaway =

African-American artist (1872–1967)

Issac Scott Hathaway
- Born: April 4, 1872; Lexington, Kentucky, U.S.
- Died: March 12, 1967 (aged 94); Birmingham, Alabama, U.S.
- Occupations: Artist, sculptor, educator
- Years active: 1894–1967

Isaac Scott Hathaway (April 4, 1872 – March 12, 1967) was an African-American artist who worked in different genres of art, including ceramics and sculpture.

== Life and career ==
Hathaway was born in 1872 (although some resources say 1874), in Lexington, Kentucky. He was born to the Reverend Robert Elijah Hathaway and his wife Rachel (née Scott), and was the youngest of their children; he was raised by his father after the death of his mother. Hathaway's desire to become an artist was a result of a visit to a museum. At the museum, Hathaway noticed there were no pieces made by or depicting African Americans; at that point, in an early stage in his life, he vowed to represent his people.

Hathaway began formal academic studies at Chandler Junior College in Lexington in 1890, followed by classes in art and dramatics at the New England Conservatory of Music in Boston, Massachusetts. While in Boston he sculpted his first bust, and his subject was Bishop Richard Allen, the first bishop of the African Methodist Episcopal Church (AME).

Hathaway attended many colleges, including Chandler College in Lexington; Pittsburg Auxiliary Normal College (now Pittsburg State University) in Pittsburg, Kansas; New York State College of Ceramics; and the Ceramic College at the State University of Kansas. At these colleges, Hathaway studied art history and ceramics, but he also developed an interest in sculpture. Hathaway had his first formal training in ceramics at the Cincinnati Art Academy.

Upon finishing his schooling, Hathaway returned to Kentucky, where he worked as a teacher in an elementary school. Hathaway began to make his own pieces in his spare time. Most of Hathaway's pieces were sculptures. He is most noted for his busts of famous African Americans, including his personal hero, Frederick Douglass. The medium of most of his pieces was plaster, but he also made some of bronze.

Hathaway's success had lasting effects. He taught at the University of Arkansas at Pine Bluff before moving to Tuskegee Institute, where he became a founding member of the Department of Ceramics. He was also the first African American to design a U.S. coin. During his life, Hathaway designed two U.S. coins. His first was the Booker T. Washington Memorial half dollar bearing the face of Booker T. Washington in 1946. His second was the George Washington Carver/Booker T. Washington commemorative half dollar in 1951, which featured George Washington Carver.

== Death and legacy ==
Hathaway's works are displayed in a museum bearing his name in Oklahoma City, Oklahoma. Hathaway died in Montgomery, Alabama on March 12, 1967, at the age of 94.

== Notes ==
- "African Americans in the Visual Arts." Long Island University. 29 Apr. 2007 <https://web.archive.org/web/20060830181739/http://www.liu.edu/cwis/cwp/library/aavaahp.htm>.
- "Isaac Hathaway, a Pioneer in Sculptor!" The African American Registry. 2005. 29 Apr. 2007 <http://www.aaregistry.com/african_american_history>.
