= Carver-Washington half dollar =

United States commemorative coin

- United States
- Value: 50 cents (0.50 US dollars)
- Mass: 12.5 g
- Diameter: 30.61 mm (1.20 in)
- Thickness: 2.15 mm (0.08 in)
- Edge: Reeded
- Composition: 90.0% silver; 10.0% copper
- Silver: 0.36169 troy oz
- Years of minting: 1951–1954
- Mintage: 1,106,292
- Mint marks: D, S

Obverse
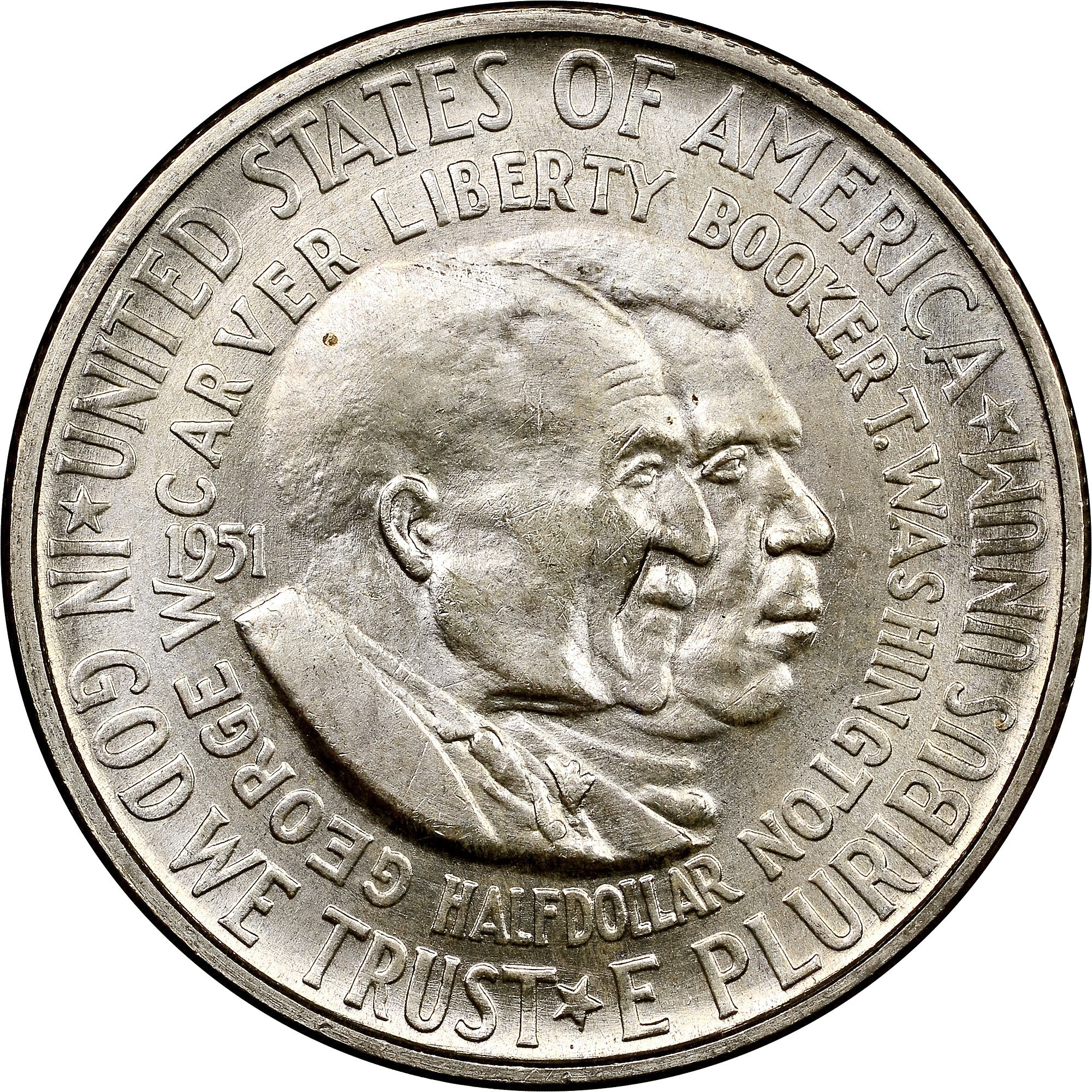
- Design: George Washington Carver and Booker T. Washington
- Designer: Isaac Scott Hathaway
- Design date: 1951

Reverse
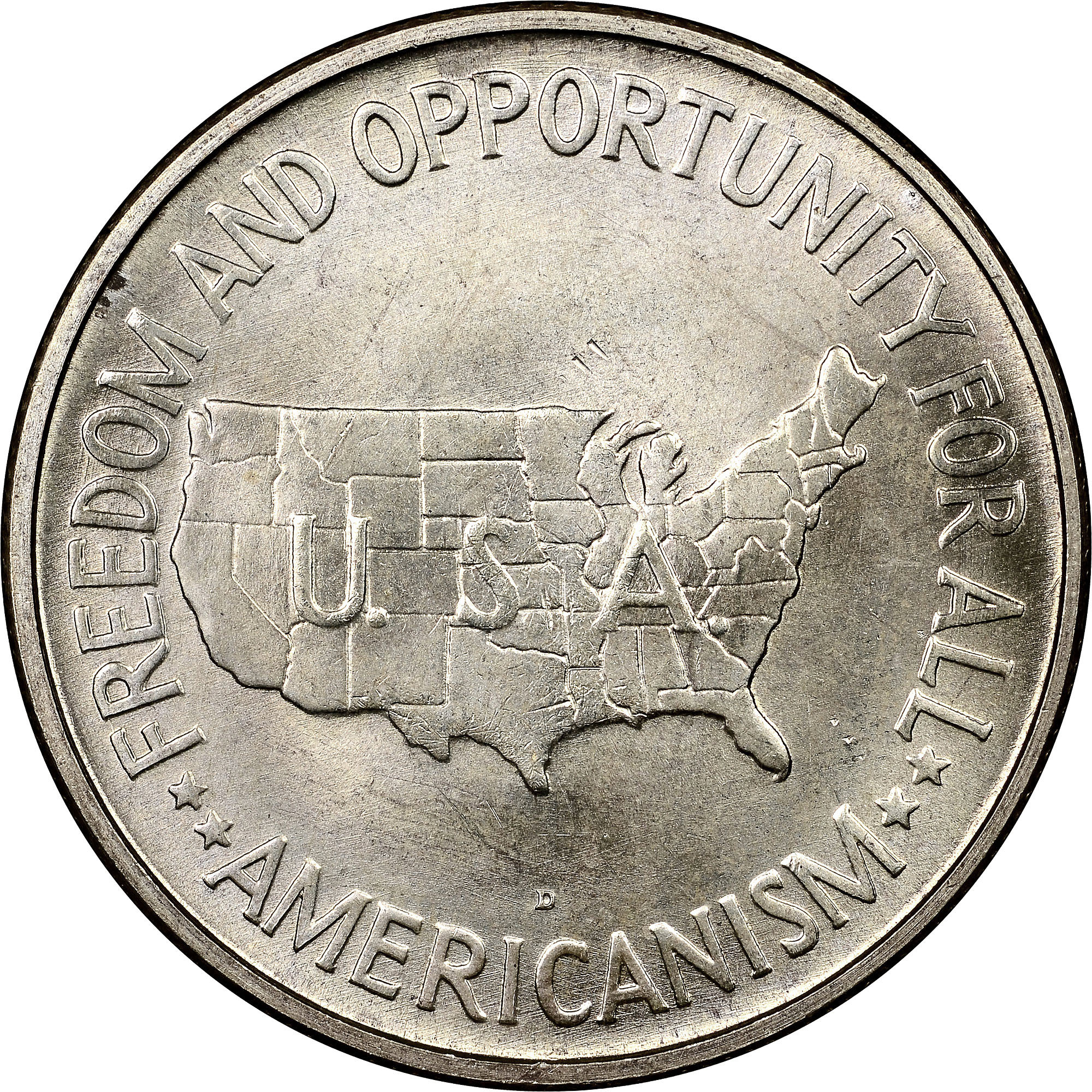
- Design: Map of the United States
- Designer: Isaac Scott Hathaway
- Design date: 1951

The George Washington Carver-Booker T. Washington half dollar, often referred to as the Carver-Washington half dollar or Washington-Carver half dollar was a commemorative coin struck by the United States Bureau of the Mint and designed by Isaac Scott Hathaway. The obverse depicts side-portraits of George Washington Carver and Booker T. Washington and the reverse shows a simple outline map of the United States of America superimposed with the letters "U.S.A.", and the words "Freedom and Opportunity for All/Americanism" around the rim. It was minted in silver from 1951 until 1954, by authority of Pub. L. 82–151. It was the final issue of early commemoratives.

== History ==
The bill authorizing the coins was pushed by the George Washington Carver National Monument Foundation, and eventually passed on September 21, 1951, authorizing the mintage of a maximum 3,415,631 coins. This odd maximum mintage number took into consideration the remaining 1,581,631 Booker T. Washington Memorial half dollars that could be melted and struck as Washington-Carver coins, with the remainder being based on the 1,834,000 unused quantity earlier authorized for the Booker T. Washington half dollar. Like the Booker T. Washington half dollar, the design for this coin was created by sculptor Isaac Scott Hathaway.

One of the reasons cited behind the Carver-Washington half dollar was "to oppose the spread of Communism among [African Americans]". One of Hathaway's early designs for the coin featured a three quarter profile portrait of Booker T. Washington behind the profile portrait of George Washington Carver on the obverse, while the reverse featured the American Legion seal with inscriptions such as "United Against the Spread of Communism."

=== Collecting ===
The coin would be produced for the following three years. They were often sold in three-coin sets (one coin for each mint mark), although large quantities of the 1951, 1952, 1953-S and 1954-S coins were struck for sale as singles. The sets were sold for between $9 and $10 each, although this would later be raised to $12 per set for the 1954 coins. The 1952, 1953-S and 1954-S issues were part of an attempt to issue the coins through banks. By the time the program ended in 1954, over a million coins had been distributed.

With a huge mintage from Philadelphia in 1952 (2,006,292), and larger ones at San Francisco in its final two years (108,020 in 1953 and 122,024 in 1954), the coins are some of the most common classic commemoratives encountered in the market in the 21st century.

== Aftermath ==
Despite being the last early commemorative issue, little attention was paid when the program ended in 1954, as by this point most American coin collectors had become bored with commemorative coins. As the Booker T. Washington and Washington-Carver Halves were little desired at that time, thousands of those coins were returned to the Mint for melting, while thousands more still held by banks were sold to speculators for a small premium (usually pennies) above face value.

Until the George Washington 250th Anniversary half dollar was issued 28 years later, in 1982, no more commemorative coins would be issued by the United States (not counting the circulating commemorative United States Bicentennial coinage). Any subsequent commemorative coin proposals were met by the Treasury Department with the long list of complaints that had arisen due to past abuses, such as the 1936 commemorative craze.
