= Booker T. Washington Memorial half dollar =

United States commemorative coin

- United States
- Value: 50 cents (0.50 US dollars)
- Mass: 12.5 g
- Diameter: 30.61 mm (1.20 in)
- Thickness: 2.15 mm (0.08 in)
- Edge: Reeded
- Composition: 90.0% silver; 10.0% copper
- Silver: 0.36169 troy oz
- Years of minting: 1946–1951
- Mintage: 1,609,041 (5,000,000 authorized)
- Mint marks: D, S

Obverse
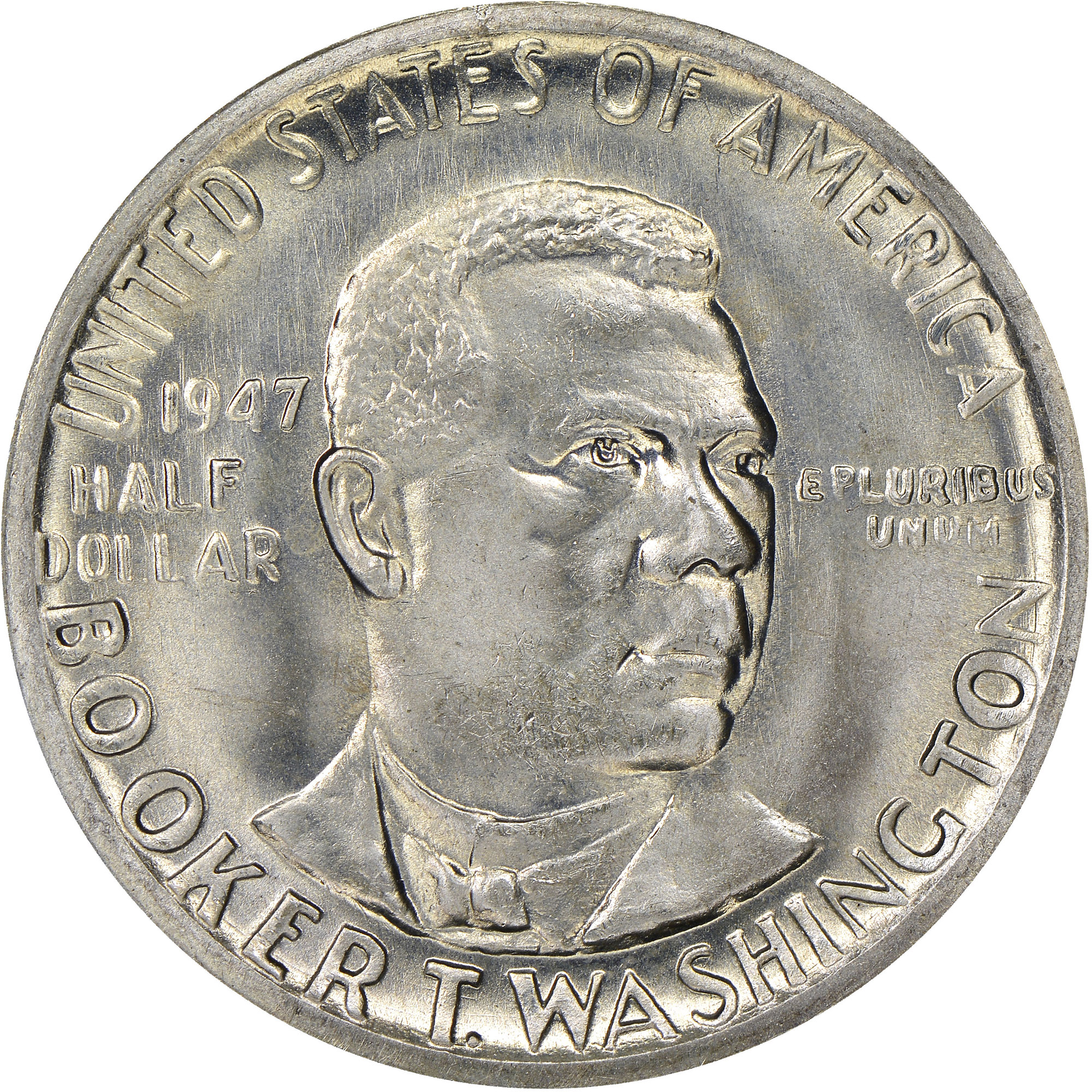
- Design: Booker T. Washington
- Designer: Isaac Scott Hathaway
- Design date: 1946

Reverse
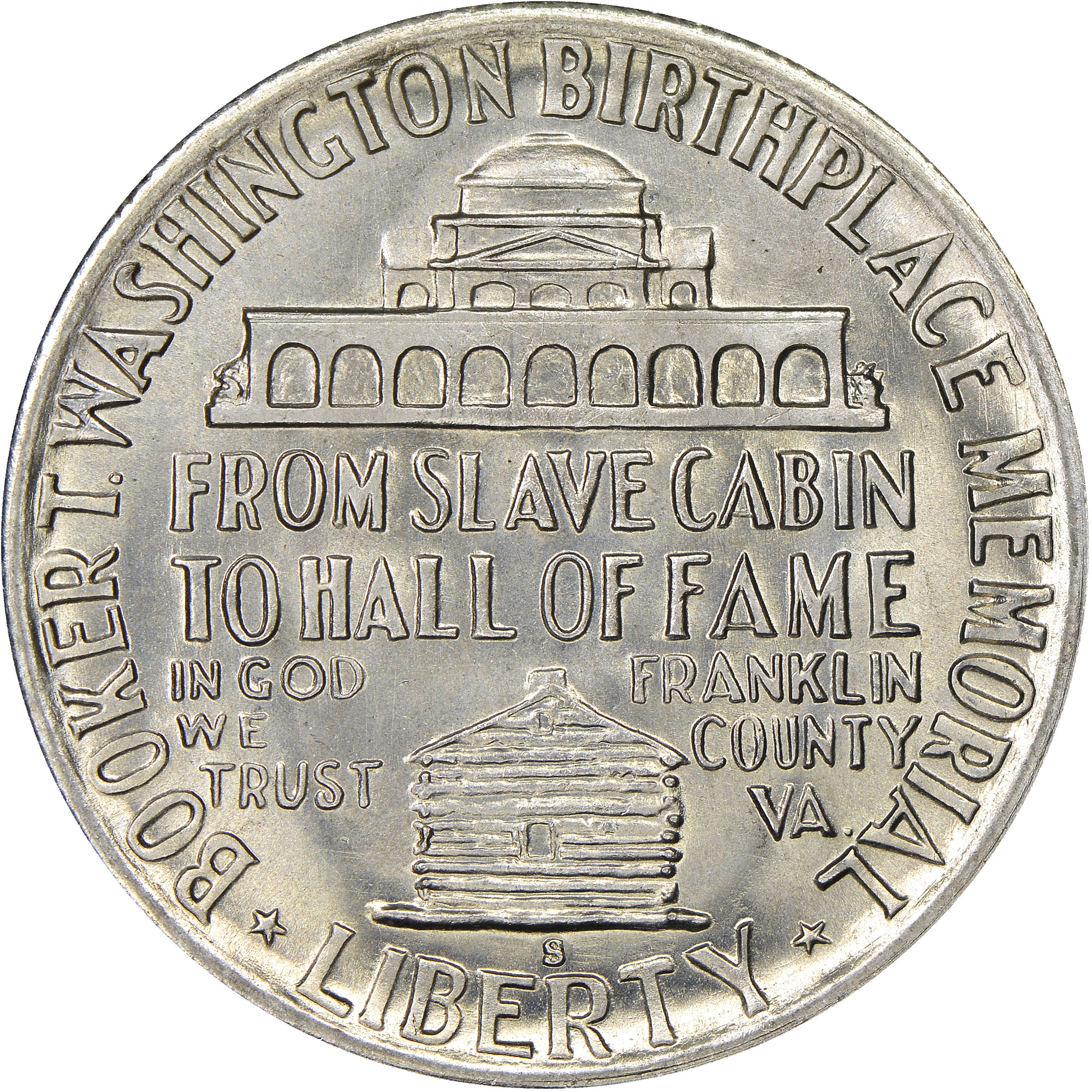
- Design: Hall of Fame for Great Americans and a log cabin
- Designer: Isaac Scott Hathaway
- Design date: 1946

The Booker T. Washington Memorial half dollar was designed by Isaac Scott Hathaway and minted in silver between 1946 and 1951. The obverse depicts Booker T. Washington. The reverse shows the cabin in which Washington was born, now the Booker T. Washington National Monument, and the Hall of Fame for Great Americans, in which Washington is honored. The description on the reverse reads "From slave cabin to Hall of Fame."

== Inception ==
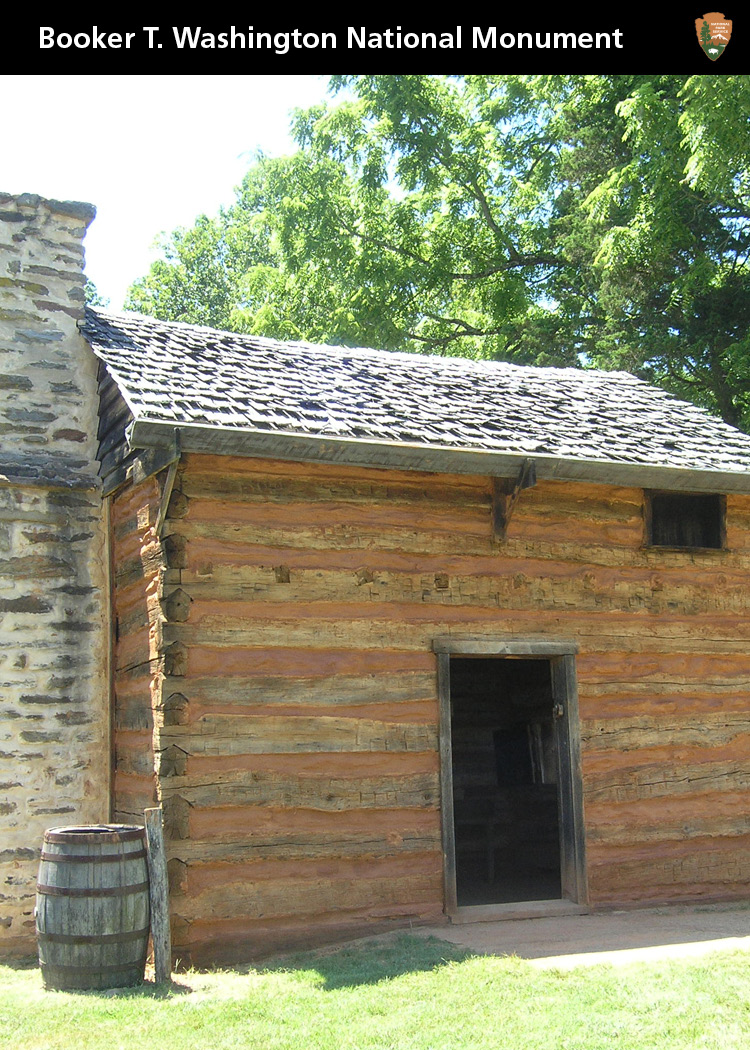
Booker T. Washington's birthplace, which is depicted on the reverse of the coin

The Booker T. Washington Birthplace Memorial Commission, which aimed to strike a commemorative coin in Washington's honor due to his importance in both American and African-American history, had successfully raised funds to buy and maintain his birthplace in Franklin County, Virginia. The funds also helped the commission to get legislation passed on August 7, 1946, which authorized the mintage of up to 5 million commemorative half dollars. There were no requirements when or at what mint the coins would be struck at, a fact which the commission noticeably took advantage of throughout the coin program, as the coins would be minted for several years at all three mints.

== Preparation ==
Sculptor Charles Keck, who had previously designed the Panama Pacific Gold Dollar, Vermont Sesquicentennial half dollar, and Lynchburg Sesquicentennial half dollar, was initially commissioned to design for the coin. Meanwhile, African-American artist Isaac Scott Hathaway learned of the coin program and offered his own design models for free, which were based on a life mask of Washington. Eventually, Hathaway's obverse model was the one that was accepted by the Commission of Fine Arts, and based on feedback from the commission, Hathaway subsequently prepared a reverse design as well. Although his models were not used, Keck was still paid for his work.

Perhaps due to the declining interest in commemorative coins, the Booker T. Washington Memorial half dollar was produced much less carefully than most previous commemorative coins. As a result, many pieces will have abrasions or contact marks on the highest points of the design, especially on Washington's cheek. During the time the coins were issued, complaints about the condition of the coins were common.

== Release ==
The coins were offered by the Booker T. Washington Birthplace Memorial Commission, and were priced at $1 each for the Philadelphia and San Francisco issues, while the lower mintage Denver issue sold for $1.50 each. During this first year, 200,000 sets were issued, with an additional 800,000 coins intended for sale as singles minted at Philadelphia. Despite the large number sold, many of the coins were either melted or released into circulation.

From 1947 through the end of the series in 1951, instead of being offered directly by the Booker T. Washington Birthplace Memorial Commission, the coins would be offered by coin firms which worked as authorized agents of the commission, notably Stack's. By then, both sales and mintage figures had considerably declined, and would continue to decline for the rest of the program. (After around 1.7 million were minted across three mints in 1946, the numbers dropped to 300,000 the following year, 60,000 in 1948, and 36,000 in 1949). The exceptions to this trend are the 1950 San Francisco and 1951 Philadelphia issues, which the commission sold as a part of a promotion which also involved schools and hospitals. However, a considerable portion of the mintage of these coins would still be returned to the mint in the following years for melting.
