= Isaac S. Taylor =

American architect

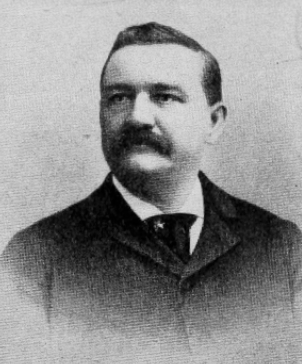
- Born: Isaac Stacker Taylor; December 31, 1850; Nashville, Tennessee
- Died: October 28, 1917 (aged 66); St. Louis, Missouri
- Occupation: Architect

Isaac "Ike" Stacker Taylor (December 31, 1850 – October 28, 1917) was an American architect. He was one of the most important architects in St. Louis and the midwestern United States at the turn of the twentieth century, designing commercial, residential, industrial, and governmental structures.

Taylor's career spanned nearly 50 years, the last 36 at the helm of his own firm, and some 215 projects. An obituary declared that "his career...has been synchronous with the architectural progress of St. Louis" and his works "in number and importance are second to none in his city." He served as Chairman of the Architectural Commission and Director of Works for the Louisiana Purchase Exposition (St. Louis World's Fair) of 1904 and himself designed numerous pavilions at the fair. Taylor was still designing up until his death at age 66 several months after the United States entered the First World War.

== Early life and career, 1850–81 ==
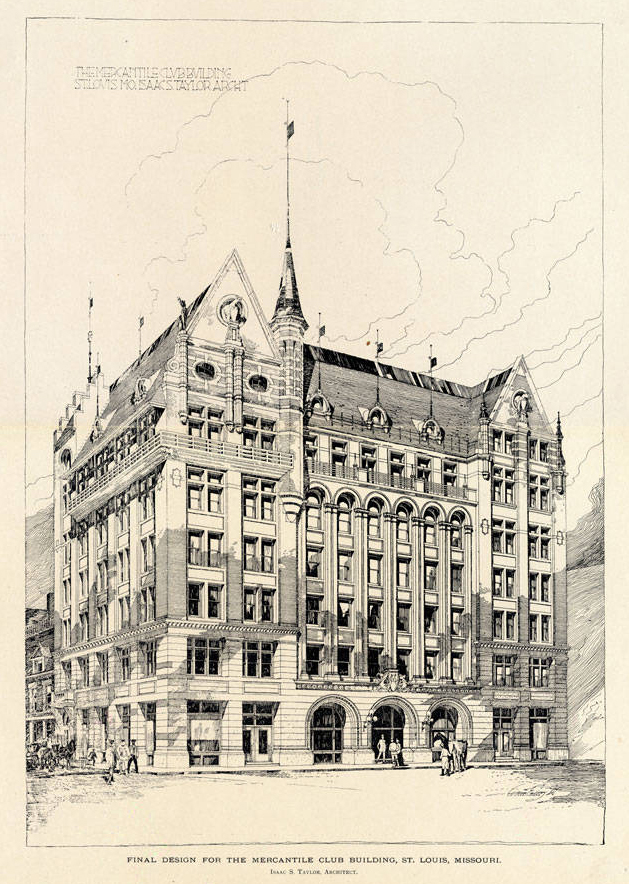
Taylor's Mercantile Club Building was one of his major downtown commissions in St. Louis during the 1890s.

Taylor was born in Nashville, Tennessee, on the last day of 1850 and moved with his parents and older brother to St. Louis a year later. At St. Louis University, he earned a degree in classical languages with honors in 1868. After graduation, he joined the firm of George I. Barnett, a native of Nottingham, England, who became St. Louis' best-known architect during the mid-nineteenth century and who trained several generations of local designers. Taylor, who rose to serve as Barnett's junior partner from 1876 to 1881, worked on several of the firm's prominent commercial projects in St. Louis, including the Southern Hotel, the Julie Building (which housed Barr's Department Store), and the Mercantile Center for the Famous Clothing Company. Taylor also contributed to the designs for many of Barnett's residential works, including Shaw Place.

== Taylor establishes his own firm, 1881–87 ==
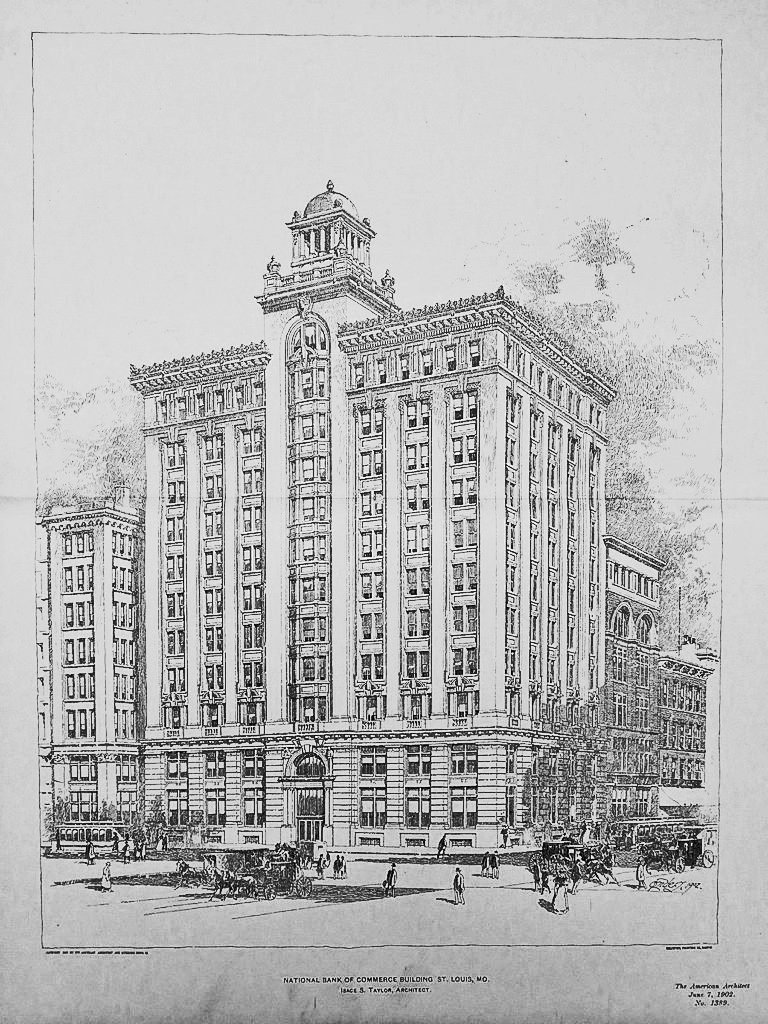
Taylor's National Bank of Commerce Building, in St. Louis, 1902, one of his largest individual structures built

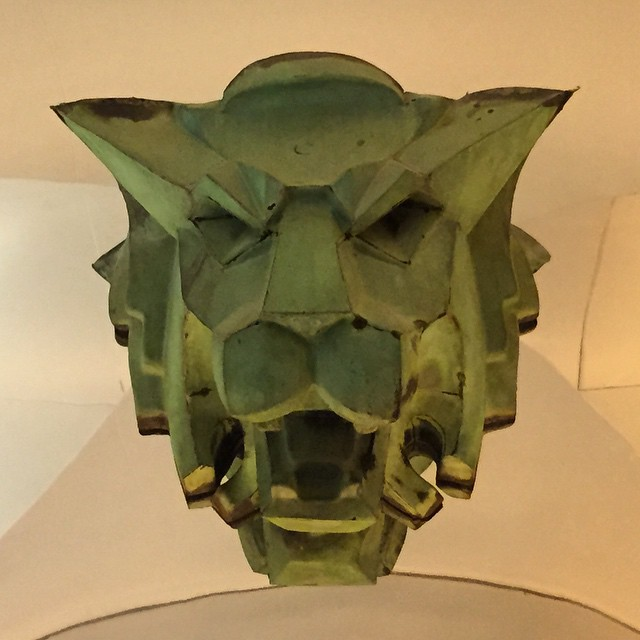
Copper lion head fixture from the National Bank of Commerce Building on display at The Wolfsonian-FIU, Miami Beach, Florida

Taylor's firm became well known for major commercial buildings in downtown St. Louis, which in the last quarter of the nineteenth century began to emerge as one of the dominant metropolises in the American Midwest, not the least because of its strategic location just south of the juncture of the Mississippi and Missouri rivers. Vast amounts of cargo passed through its ports, particularly raw agricultural products from the South and the states of the Great Plains as well as industrial products from the manufacturing centers in the North.

According to David Simmons, Taylor built his career by establishing a reputation as "an honest and dedicated architect" who strove to complete commissions in a timely manner and within his given budget, while still accepting challenging jobs that other designers refused to take. Such renown undoubtedly became an asset in a profession where designers often famously underestimate the costs and timeline for their buildings' completion.

The firm's success seems to have taken off during the mid-1880s, with 1885 being a particularly pivotal date. That year, Taylor completed the Drummond Building, a six-story Italian-Renaissance-Revival structure in downtown St. Louis, which housed the corporate offices and factory of the Drummond Tobacco Company, the city's second-largest manufacturer of the product. St. Louis had become a major tobacco-processing center during the latter part of the century, and Taylor's firm eventually was responsible for erecting nine different factories, three of them for Drummond. Taylor also broke into the market for designing some of the city's newest lodging establishments, finishing the Beers Hotel at 4th and Olive Streets in 1884 and remodeling the Laclede Hotel into the new Hurst Hotel in 1885 (he would be called on to revamp this hotel again in 1897). At the same time he expanded his reach into industrial architecture, finishing factories for the St. Louis Illuminating Company in 1885 and the Woodward and Tiernan Print Co in 1887. Taylor also began to attract commissions outside St. Louis during this time, erecting the Crescent Hotel in the resort town of the Ozarks, Eureka Springs, Arkansas (1885) and the National Hotel in Peoria, Illinois (1887).

== Mature career, 1888–1901 ==
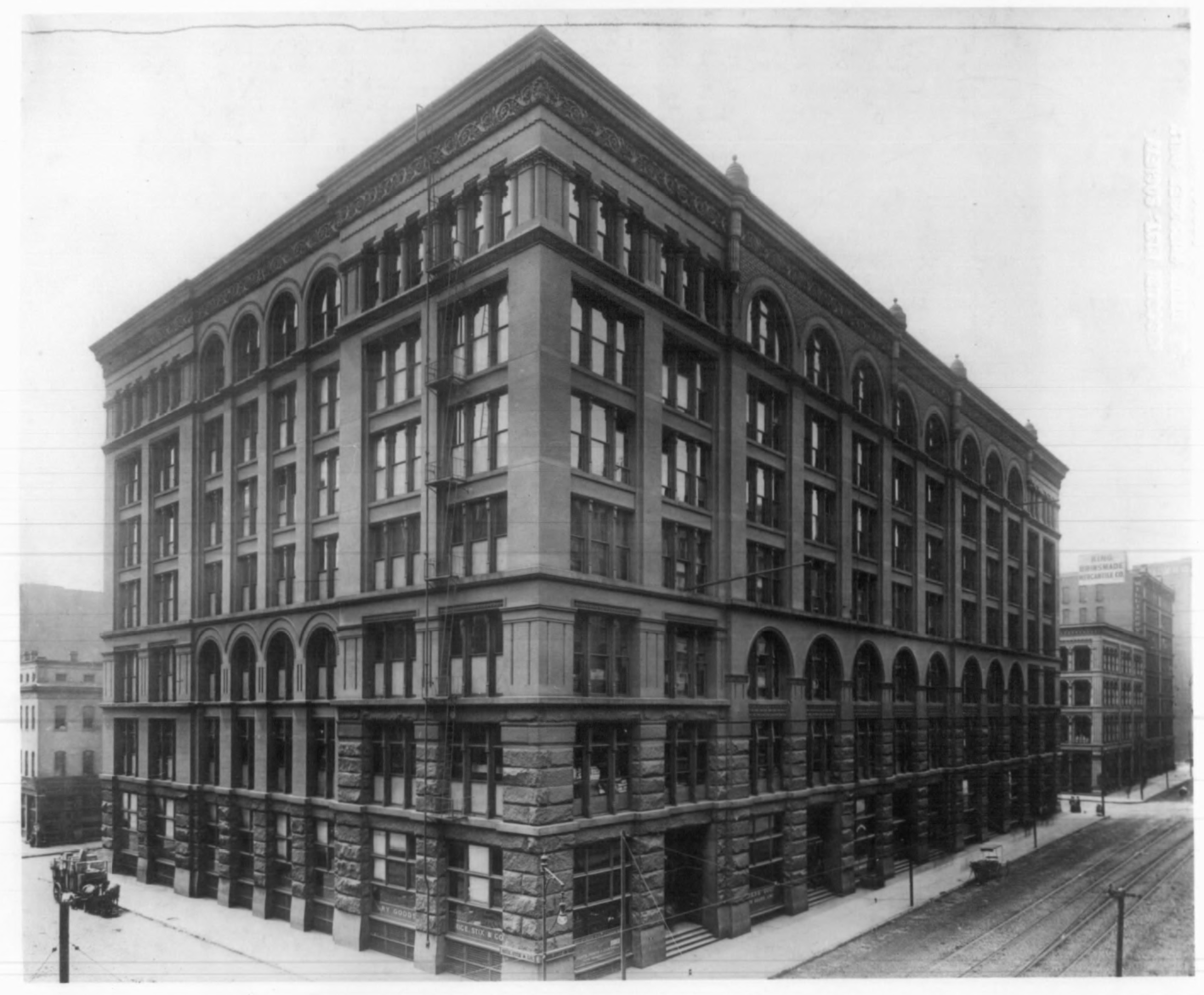
The Liggett & Myers/Rice-Stix Building (later the Gateway Merchandise Mart), was the building that firmly established Taylor's reputation as a leading architect in St. Louis.

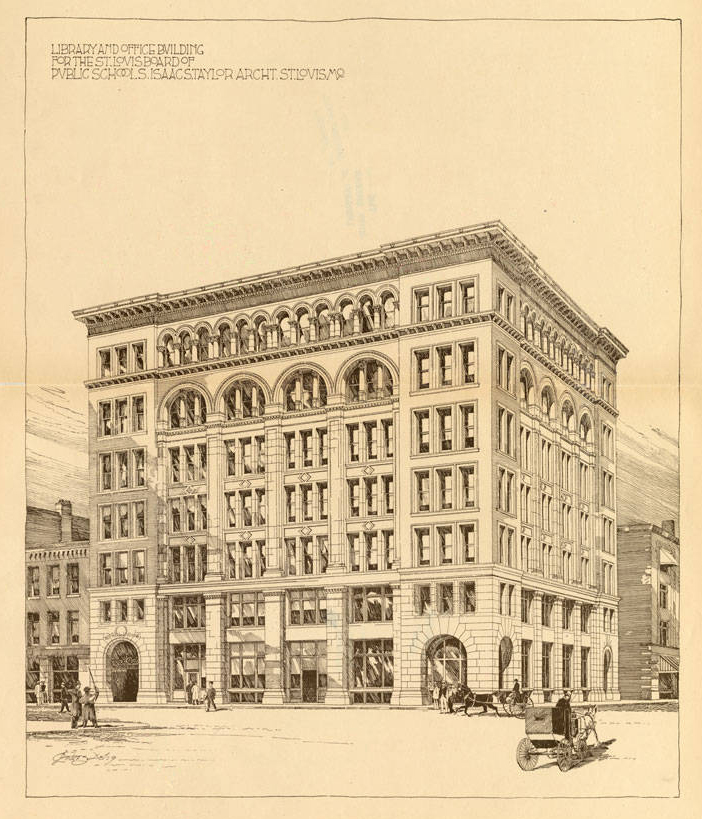
The Board of Education Building in St. Louis was one of several civic structures Taylor eventually designed.

Between 1888 and 1901, Taylor rose to the top of the architectural profession in St. Louis. The downtown core of the city took definitive shape with a swath of major building projects, including Louis Sullivan's famous Wainwright Building, completed in 1891. Taylor built 40 of these new structures for major corporate clients, bringing his firm considerable financial success. One reason was his 1890 hiring of a new chief designer, Milwaukee native Oscar Enders (1865-1926), who had gained considerable experience as a draftsman with several firms in Chicago, and who in 1895 became the second president of the St. Louis Architectural Sketch Club. David Simmons credits Enders for bringing a "fresh, contemporary look" to Taylor's firm's projects in the 1890s.

=== Downtown St. Louis ===
St. Louis' protracted growth at the close of the nineteenth century was due to its strategic location as a transportation hub for steamboat and railroad traffic, particularly following the completion of the Eads Bridge over the Mississippi River in 1874. Many businesses based in St. Louis expanded, constructing lavish new headquarters or speculative office buildings. Taylor was intimately involved in this construction boom. The building that apparently secured Taylor's reputation as one of the city's top architects was the Liggett & Myers/Rice-Stix Building (1888–89), a massive brick and Missouri granite structure occupying an entire city block on Washington Avenue between Tenth and Eleventh Streets in an emerging mercantile wholesale district. A speculative property built by the tobacco giant Liggett & Myers to lease space to other firms (including, eventually, the entire building to Rice-Stix, a wholesale dry goods company), the building still stands in remarkably well-preserved condition, though it has now been converted to apartments. It is, along with one other structure, the sole surviving example of a Taylor Romanesque Revival commercial design. The building reputedly cost a whopping $900,000 ($31,496,667 today), as Liggett & Myers were "unsparing of money in order to make [on] their block [a building] rarely equaled for utility and grandeur." Taylor built a solid structure, with an interior supported by massive brick arches, cast iron columns encased in hollow tile, and steel floor beams covered with seven inches of yellow pine that was in turn topped with one-inch-thick dressed maple. Probably influenced by John Wellborn Root's Rookery Building in Chicago, Taylor made extensive use of terracotta ornament and iron interior staircases. Manufactured by Pullis Brothers, the ironwork required for the building was said to be the largest contract ever awarded in St. Louis. The city's architectural press gave Taylor high praise upon the building's completion, calling the block's transformation "a wonderful evidence of St. Louis' building progress."

Taylor attracted a steady flow of clients from all different industries in St. Louis. The buildings he designed in the central business district reflect such diversity, though typologically they did not differ substantially, consisting mostly of monumental office blocks that ranged from 3 to 10 stories in height and often dominated their sites. These included such works as the Rialto Building (1892), an impressive Romanesque Revival structure punctuated by bay windows and large projecting cornice; the Mercantile Club Building (1891), an asymmetrical, picturesque Romanesque/Gothic Revival structure with a roofline punctuated by tall gables and thin spires; the Neoclassical Curlee Clothing Company Building (1899); and the massive 424-room, ten-story Planter's House Hotel, at the time one of St. Louis' premier lodging establishments, which opened in 1894. In 1901-02 he completed the National Bank of Commerce, a towering eleven-story French Renaissance skyscraper that housed 198 offices; sculptural lion heads from its interior are now on display at The Wolfsonian-Florida International University in Miami Beach.

Taylor developed close contacts with the newspaper industry in St. Louis, which probably contributed greatly to his success during this period and into the new century. He completed the headquarters for two of the city's major press outlets during this period: the Globe-Democrat Building at 6th and Pine Streets (1889) and the St. Louis Republic Building at 7th and Olive in 1899. In an article in 1894, the latter singled out Taylor for his ability to combine aesthetic taste with practicality as one of his particular strengths as a designer that contributed to his success. This is likely accurate, as Taylor was not a particularly innovative designer; though versatile in a variety of styles, he did not deviate from the eclecticism popular among most late nineteenth-century American designers; nor at first glance does he seem to have developed any new handling of space, materials, or volumes. He seems to have been mostly focused on giving clients what they wanted and keeping in touch with popular design trends, objectives that would have served him well in the growing corporate culture of St. Louis.

=== Connections abroad ===
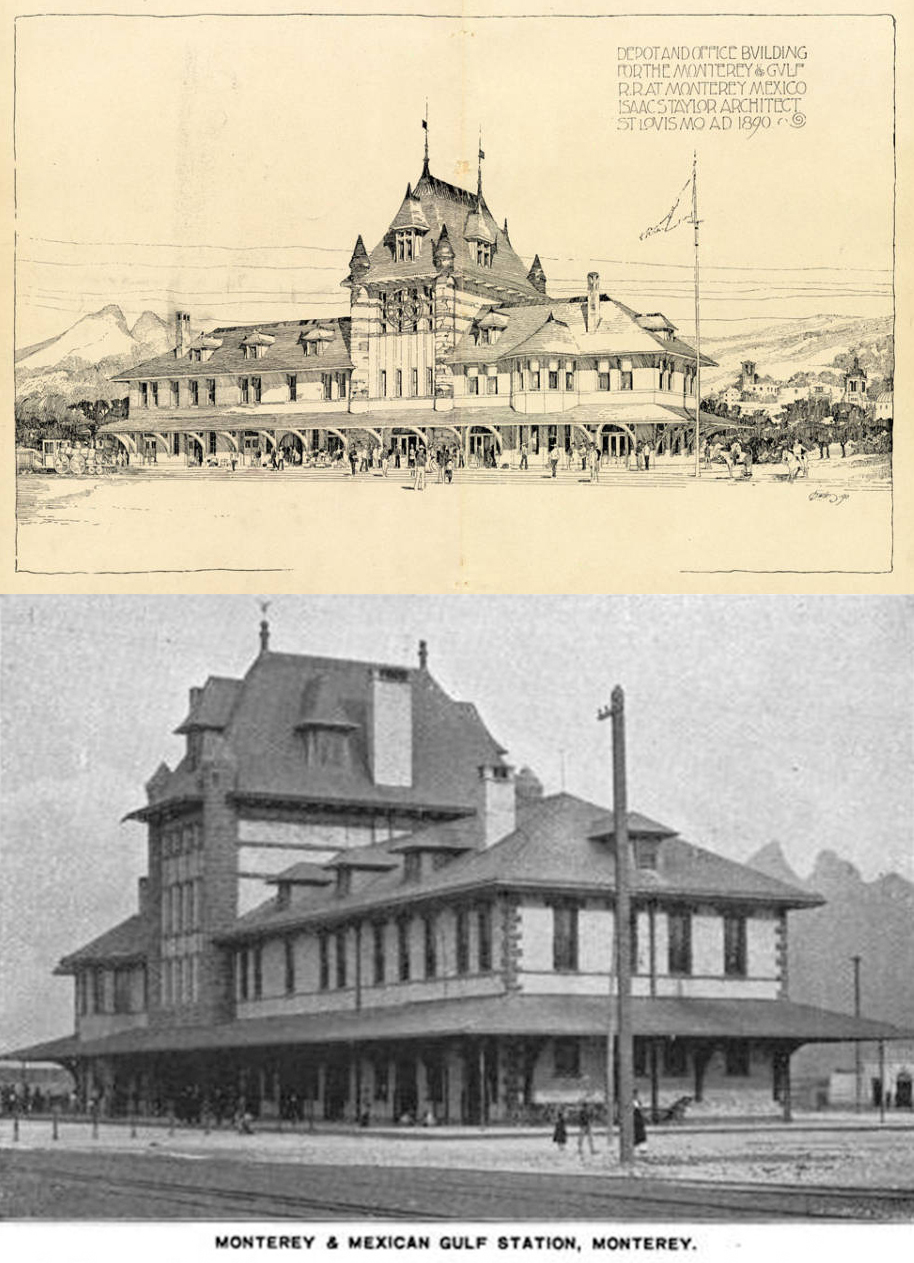
Taylor designed the Monterey and Gulf Railroad Depot in Mexico, finished in 1894; the 1899 photo of the station as built appears to show a reversal of the main pavilion around the central axis from the original design.

Taylor's family connections provided him with the chance to build a few structures abroad as well. In the early 1890s, his brother George S. Taylor, a businessman in Mexico City, helped him land his most important hotel commission, the Grand National Hotel, a lavish Spanish Colonial structure that included some 400 guest rooms with a 150-foot observation tower attached to its courtyard, in the early 1890s. At the same time, he designed the new passenger depot for the Monterey and Gulf Railroad in Monterrey, finished in 1894.

== As World's Fair architect, 1901–04 ==
The crowning achievement of Taylor's career was his direction of the architectural ensemble for the Louisiana Purchase Exposition, the only world's fair hosted by St. Louis. In 1901, Taylor's strong connections to St. Louis' leaders in business and industry, including the city's most influential banker, landed him the position of chairman of the Architectural Commission and Director of Works. Taylor hired a young architect, Emmanuel Louis Masqueray, as his chief designer, and the two of them collaborated on the overall layout of the fair, which consisted of the somewhat-odd arrangement of two axes of buildings set at a right angle to each other and bisected by a third axis formed by the Grand Lagoon at a 45-degree diagonal.

Taking a break from his own architectural practice, he began working 12-hour days, seven days a week on the fair. Taylor's task of supervising the design and construction of all the major buildings for the fair was a gigantic task, and was complicated his constant struggles for funds, but he pulled it off admirably from all accounts. In addition to functioning as the CEO of design and construction, negotiating personalities, timelines, and budgets, Taylor himself designed several major structures, all of which were temporary. Among them, were the largest structure, the Agriculture Building, which covered more than 18 acres and cost $525,000; Statler's Inside Inn; the Missouri State Building; the Horticulture Building; the Forestry, Fishery, and Game Building; and the Livestock Exhibition Complex.

== Return to private practice, 1905–17 ==
After the 1904 Exposition, Taylor rejoined his firm, which had suffered financially during his absence. The latter half of the first decade of the twentieth century was marked by several tall commercial building projects in central St. Louis. These included the Mills Building (1906), the Aberdeen Building (1907), and the LaSalle Building (1909), a narrow 13-story structure that used the Simplex reinforced concrete system of 370 piles between the foundation and the bedrock 65 feet below grade. The building was characterized by vertical strips of brick alternating with projecting, terracotta-faced white oriel windows, serviced by three elevators. The most innovative project, though, involved the raising of the Equitable Building in St. Louis in 1910 by setting the top eight stories on hydraulic jacks and replacing the bottom two floors and the brick-and-stone foundation with a reinforced concrete and steel structure behind a glass skin. In the last decade of his career Taylor also completed several annexes to other large office buildings that had outgrown their original spaces, including the Times Building Annex (1910) and the Mercantile Trust Company Annex (1916).

=== Work in Texas ===
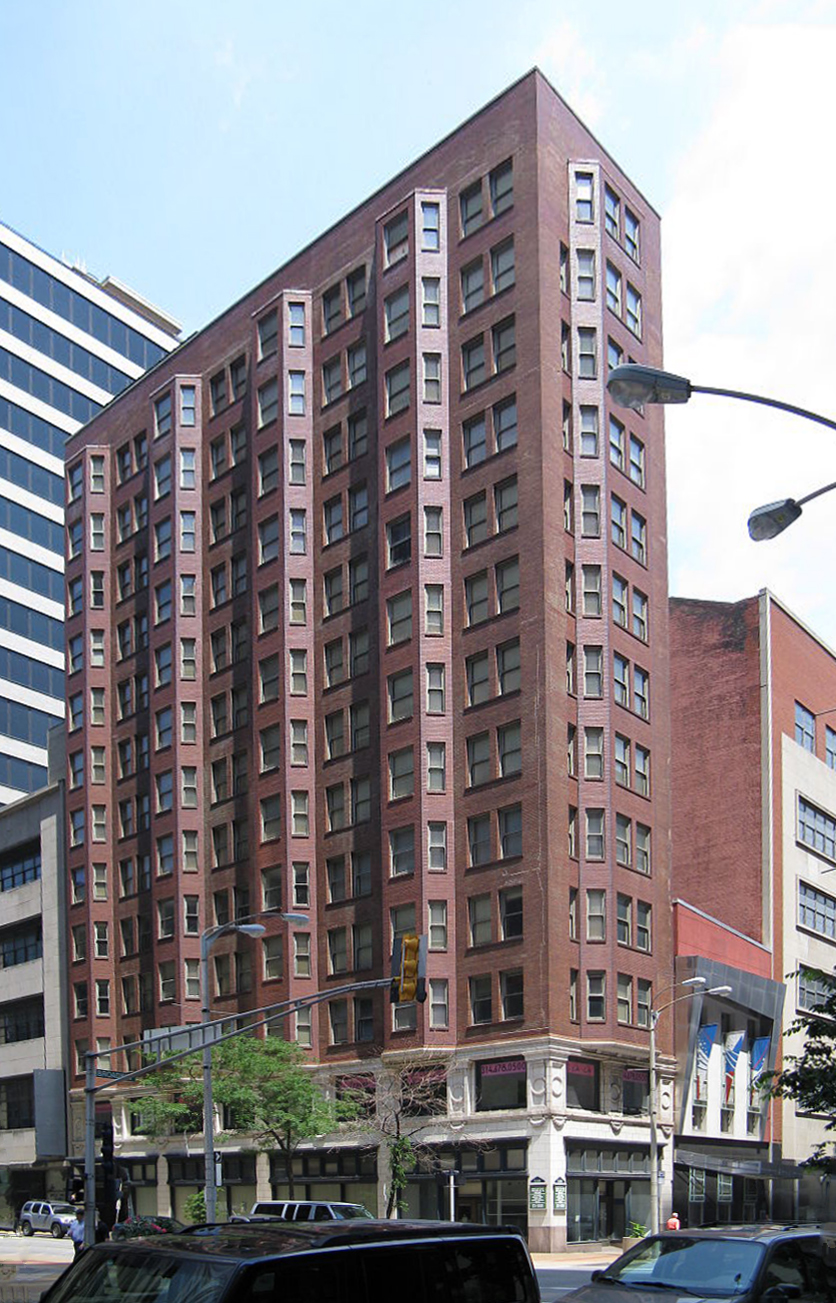
The LaSalle Building was one of Taylor's important downtown commissions after the 1904 World's Fair.

Taylor had developed some contacts in Texas in the 1880s that began to bear fruit for him during the new century. He was hired to construct the new Majestic Theater in Dallas by the Interstate Amusement Company in 1911, which unfortunately burned down in 1917 and was replaced by the current Majestic Theater, designed by the famed movie theater architect John Eberson and opened in 1921. In 1912, the Dallas Chamber of Commerce hired him to design their new 11-story office building for $500,000.

=== Government buildings ===
Taylor also completed two permanent monumental civic structures in his last years, both of them exercises in axial, Beaux-Arts neoclassicism, as befitting the City Beautiful movement, then in vogue in a number of major American metropolitan centers. Opened in 1910, the Municipal Courts Building originally housed not just courtroom and detention cells (and was adjacent to Taylor's newly built municipal jail), but also the Health Department, Police headquarters, coroner's office, and the Board of Election Commissioners. Its I-shaped plan incorporates six light courts around which most of the offices and hallways are arranged.

The other major government commission Taylor undertook was the Jefferson Memorial Building, at the entrance to Forest Park in St. Louis, in 1911-12, on the exact site of the main entrance to the 1904 World's Fair. Now the Missouri History Museum, and only slightly altered, the monumental structure, rather simply but elegantly arranged in two long wings around a central columned loggia, houses the collections of the Missouri Historical Society. The central loggia included Karl Bitter's huge sculpture of Thomas Jefferson.

== Personal life ==
Taylor was a lifelong bachelor. A large man, he garnered renown for his "gargantuan...frame and appetite." Taylor was well-liked, and was said to have a big heart and great "conviviality." He was also known for being studious, apparently being extremely well-read in the history of the United States as well as an expert on Gothic architecture. Taylor's congenial nature no doubt allowed him to build a robust network of personal and business connections. He was well-respected among his peers and one of the leaders of the increasing professionalization of architecture in America at the end on the nineteenth century, becoming a charter member of the Western Association of Architects. Upon its merger with the American Institute of Architects, he remained a member of the St. Louis Chapter and later was named a Fellow of the AIA.

Taylor died at home at age 66, rather suddenly, in October 1917. He left an estate of $400,000, a considerable sum at the time, most of which went to his brother George, who was residing in Mexico City. Taylor left $5,000 and his architectural library and records to Oscar Enders.

== List of works ==
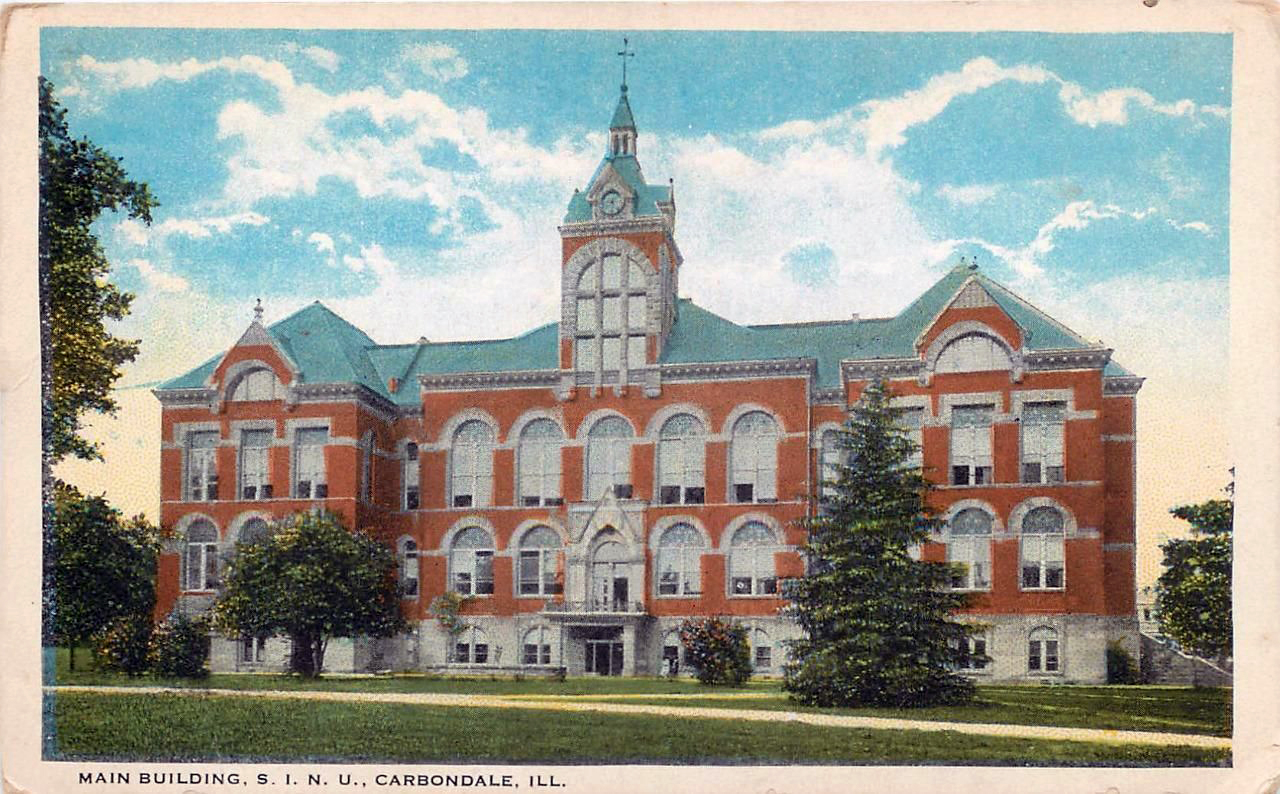
Old Main at Southern Illinois University, in Carbondale, built in 1887, was Taylor's only higher education commission, and for decades it was the oldest building on the SIU campus. It burned in 1969.

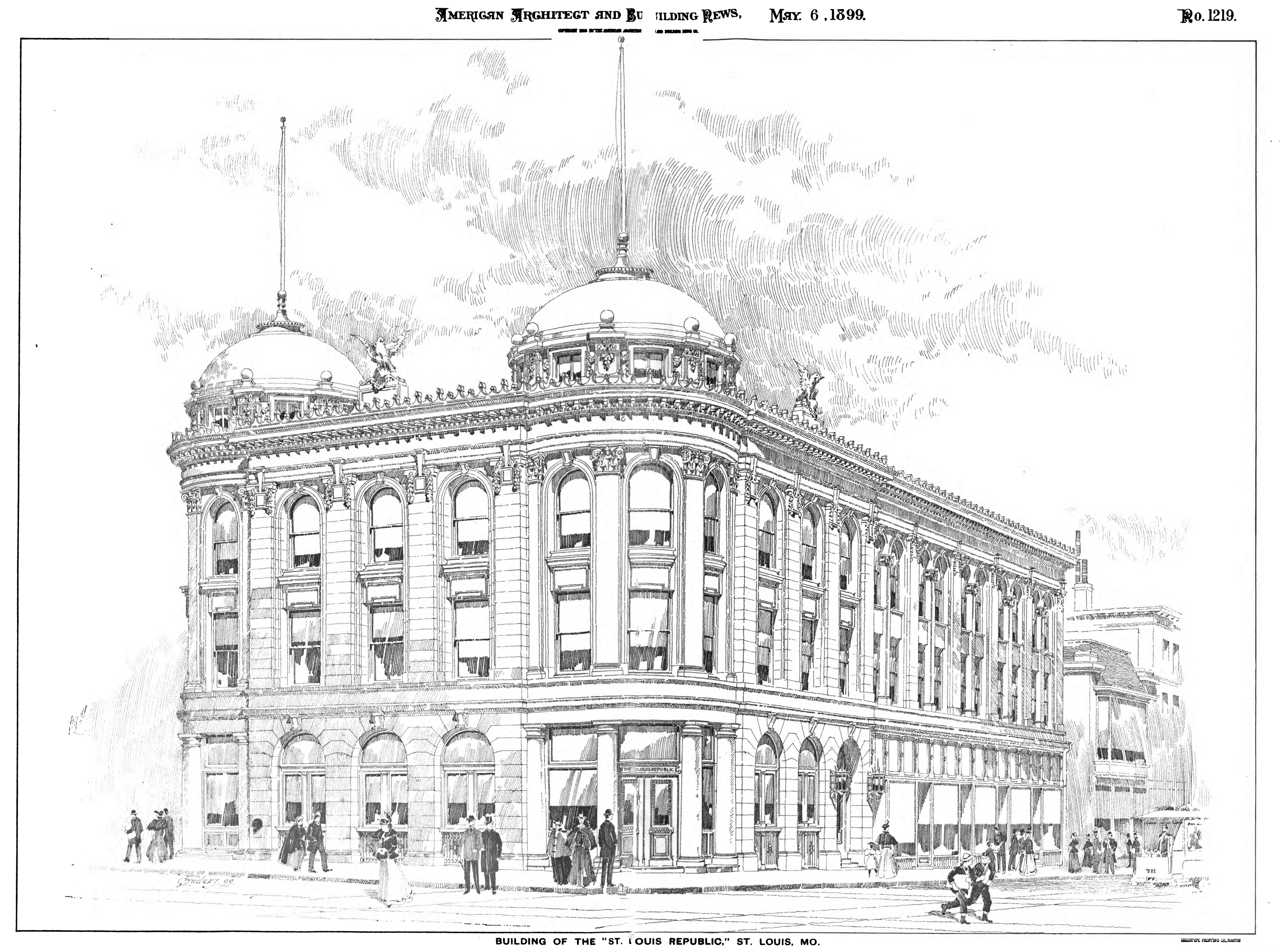
The St. Louis Republic was one of two newspaper buildings constructed by Taylor, and its drawings were published in the American Architect and Building News.

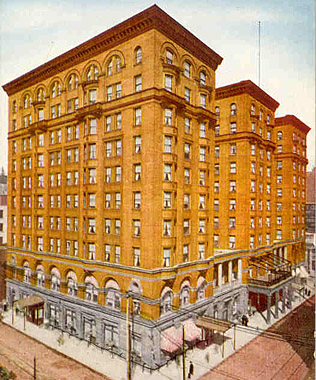
Taylor's Planter's Hotel in downtown St. Louis was one of his most important commissions of this building type.

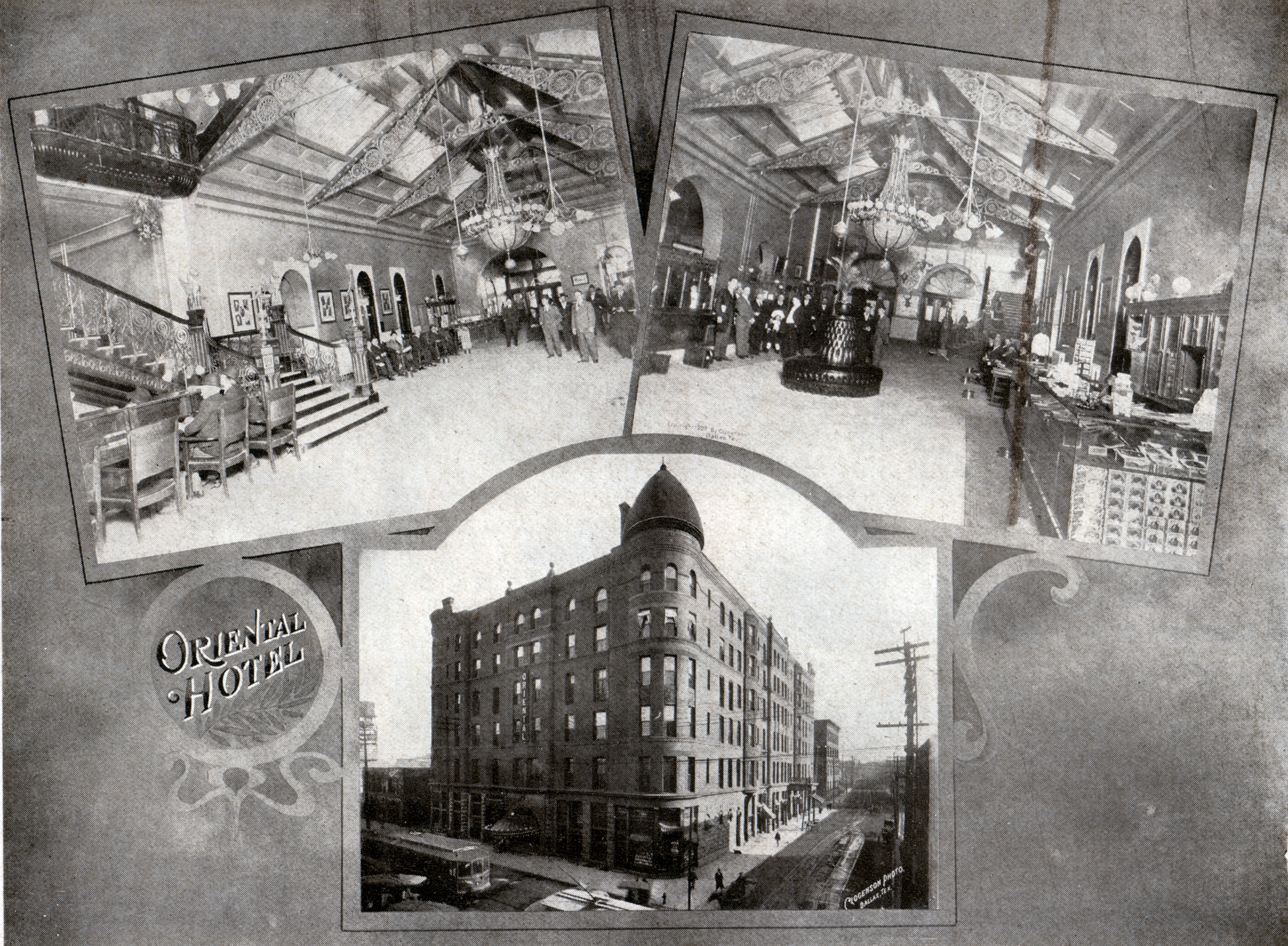
The Oriental Hotel in Dallas was one of Taylor's first commissions outside of Missouri, and was one of the city's premier lodging establishments in the early twentieth century.

=== Educational buildings ===
- Old Main, Southern Illinois Normal School (now Southern Illinois University), Carbondale (1887; burned 1969)

=== Factories ===
- Columbia Box Company, St. Louis (1906)
- Drummond Tobacco Company Factories, St. Louis (1885)
- Guernsey Scudder Electric Light Company, St. Louis (1890)
- Hamilton & Brown Shoe Company, St. Louis, Boonville, Columbia (Missouri) [ten projects] (1900-1916)
- Liggett and Myers Tobacco Company
  - Folsom Avenue Plant, St. Louis (1896)
- Mallinckrodt Chemical Company Factories, St. Louis (1895-1900)
- Robert Brown Oil Company, St. Louis (1889)
- P.C. Murphy Trunk Company, St. Louis (1892)
- St. Louis Illuminating Company (1885)
- Woodward & Tiernan Print Company, St. Louis (1887)

=== Government and civic buildings ===
- Board of Education Offices and Library, St. Louis (1891)
- City Jail, St. Louis (1910)
- Jefferson Memorial Building (now the Missouri History Museum), St. Louis (1911–12)
- Municipal Courts Building, St. Louis (1910)

=== Hotels ===
- Crescent Hotel, Eureka Springs, Arkansas (1885)
- Grand National Hotel, Mexico City, D.F., Mexico (1892)
- Hurst Hotel, St. Louis (1885) (remodeled by Taylor, 1897)
- Monterrey House, Monterrey, Mexico (1894)
- National Hotel, Peoria, Illinois (1887)
- Oriental Hotel, Dallas, Texas (1890)
- Planter's House Hotel, St. Louis (1894)
- Union Station Hotel, St. Louis (1894)

=== Louisiana Purchase Exposition (all completed 1904) ===
- Agriculture Building
- Forestry, Fishery, and Game Building
- Grandview Inn (off-site)
- Horticulture Building
- Livestock Exhibition Complex
- Missouri State Building
- Service Building
- Statler's Inside Inn

=== Office buildings ===
- Aberdeen Building, St. Louis (1907)
- Bee Hat Company Building, St. Louis (1899)
- Columbia Building, St. Louis (1890)
- DeMenil Building, St. Louis (1893)
- Globe-Democrat Building, St. Louis (1889)
- Interstate Building, St. Louis (1892)
- Kennard Building, St. Louis (1900)
- LaSalle Building, St. Louis (1909)
- Liggett and Myers Tobacco Company/Rice-Stix Building/Gateway Merchandise Mart, St. Louis (1888)
- Mercantile Trust Company Annex Building, St. Louis (1916)
- Rice-Stix building, St. Louis {1889)
- Meyer Brothers Drug Company, St. Louis (1889)
- Mills Building, St. Louis (1906)
- National Bank of Commerce Building, St. Louis (1902)
- Nicholson Building, St. Louis (1893)
- Republic [newspaper] Building, St. Louis (1899)
- Rialto Building, St. Louis (1892)
- Silk Exchange Building, St. Louis (1901)

=== Railroad stations ===
- Monterrey and Gulf Railroad Depot, Monterrey, Mexico (1890–94)

=== Residences ===
- Archbishop's Residence, Catholic Archdiocese of St. Louis (1891; demolished 1956)
- R.G. Carson House, St. Louis (1893)
- Chauncey Ladd House, St. Louis (1905)
- "Maylanson Manor" for Alanson C. Brown, Ladue, Missouri (1910)
- J.M. Sloan House, St. Louis (1906)
- Thomas S. Sullivan House, St. Louis (1901)
- William H. Thompson House, St. Louis (1897)

== Gallery ==
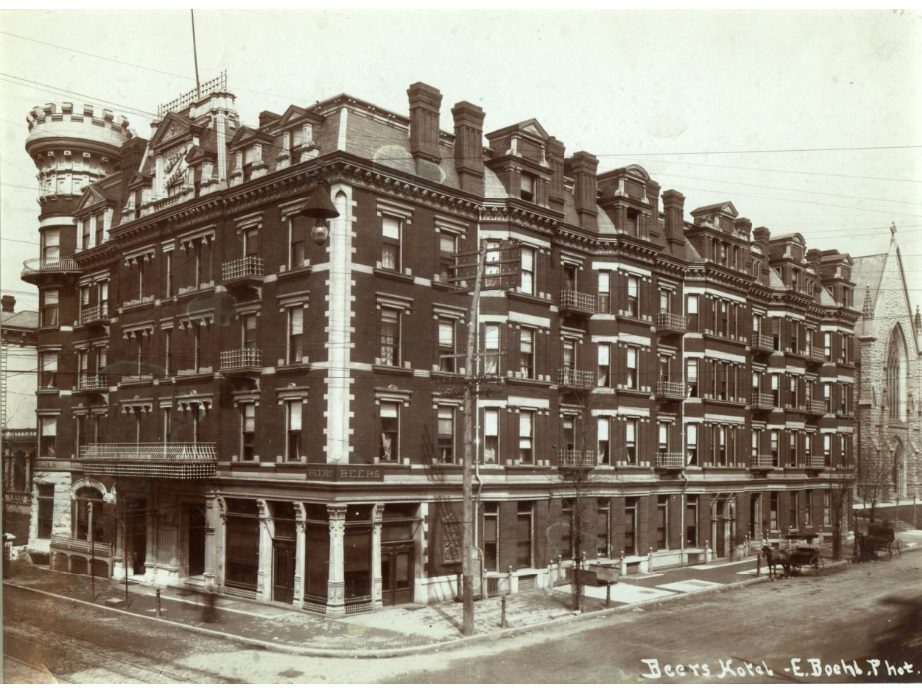
Beers Hotel, St. Louis, 1884

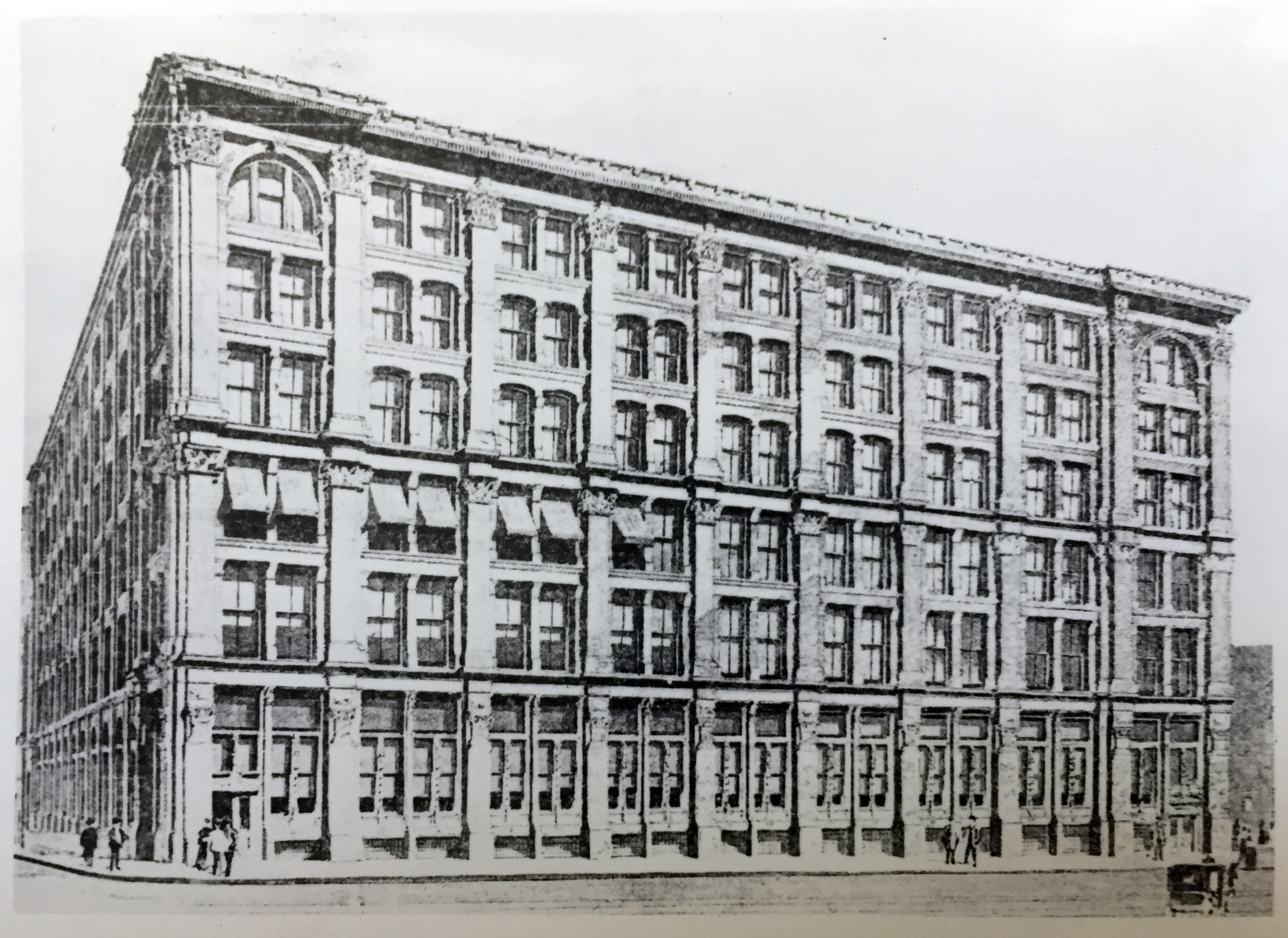
Drummond Tobacco Company Building, St. Louis, 1885

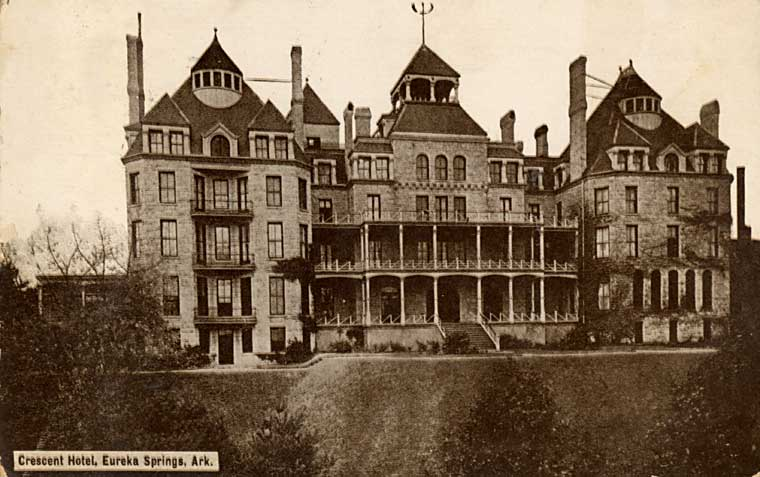
Crescent Hotel, Eureka Springs, Arkansas, 1885

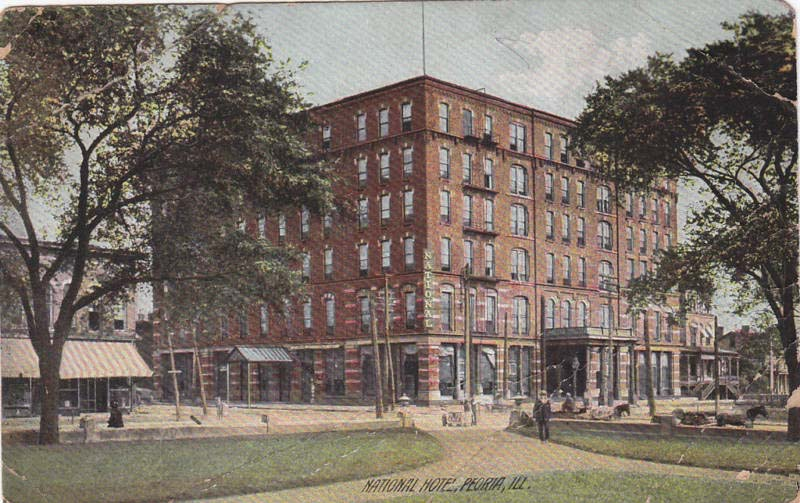
National Hotel, Peoria, Illinois, 1887

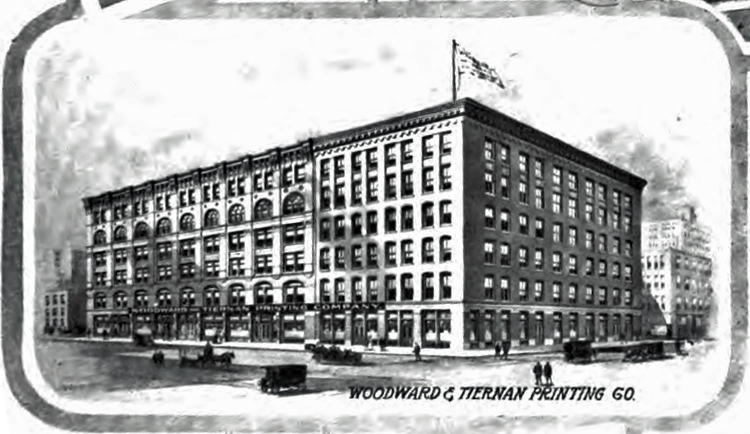
Woodward & Tiernan Print Company, St. Louis, 1887

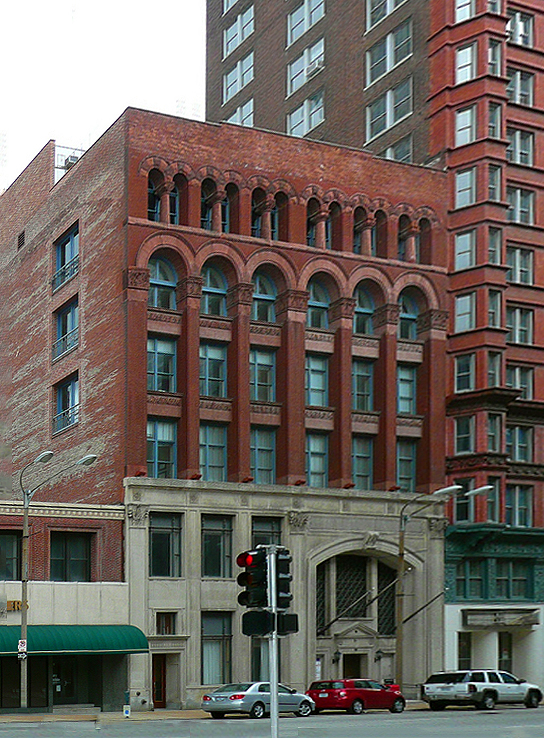
Louisville & Nashville Railroad Building, St. Louis, 1888

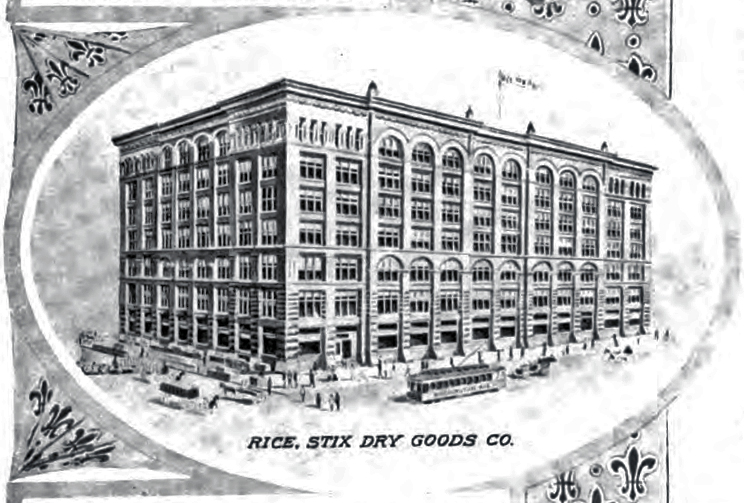
Liggett & Myers/Rice-Stix Building/Merchandise Mart, St. Louis, 1888–89

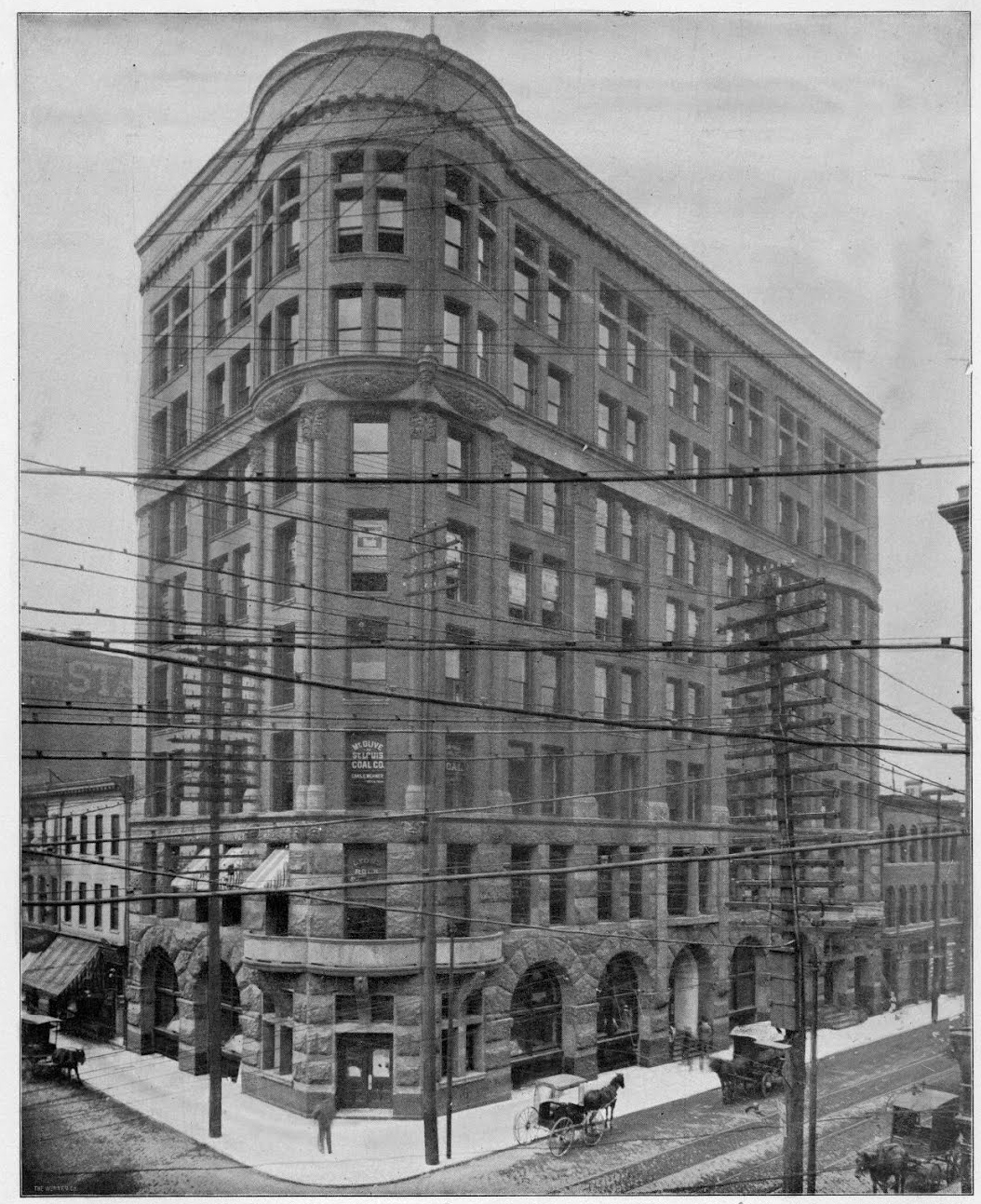
Globe-Democrat Building, St. Louis, 1889

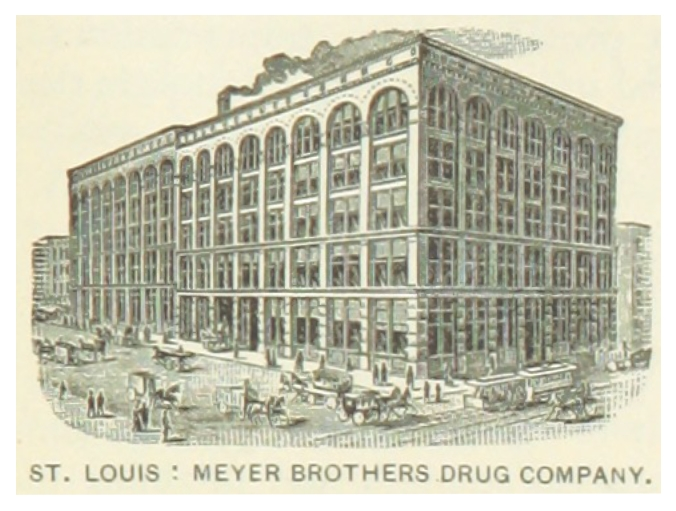
Meyer Brothers Drug Company, St. Louis, 1889

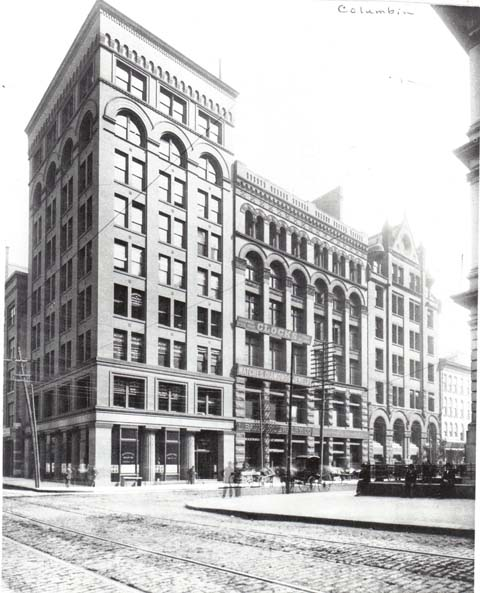
Columbia Building (1890–92, at left) and L&N Railroad Building (1888), St. Louis, both designed by Taylor

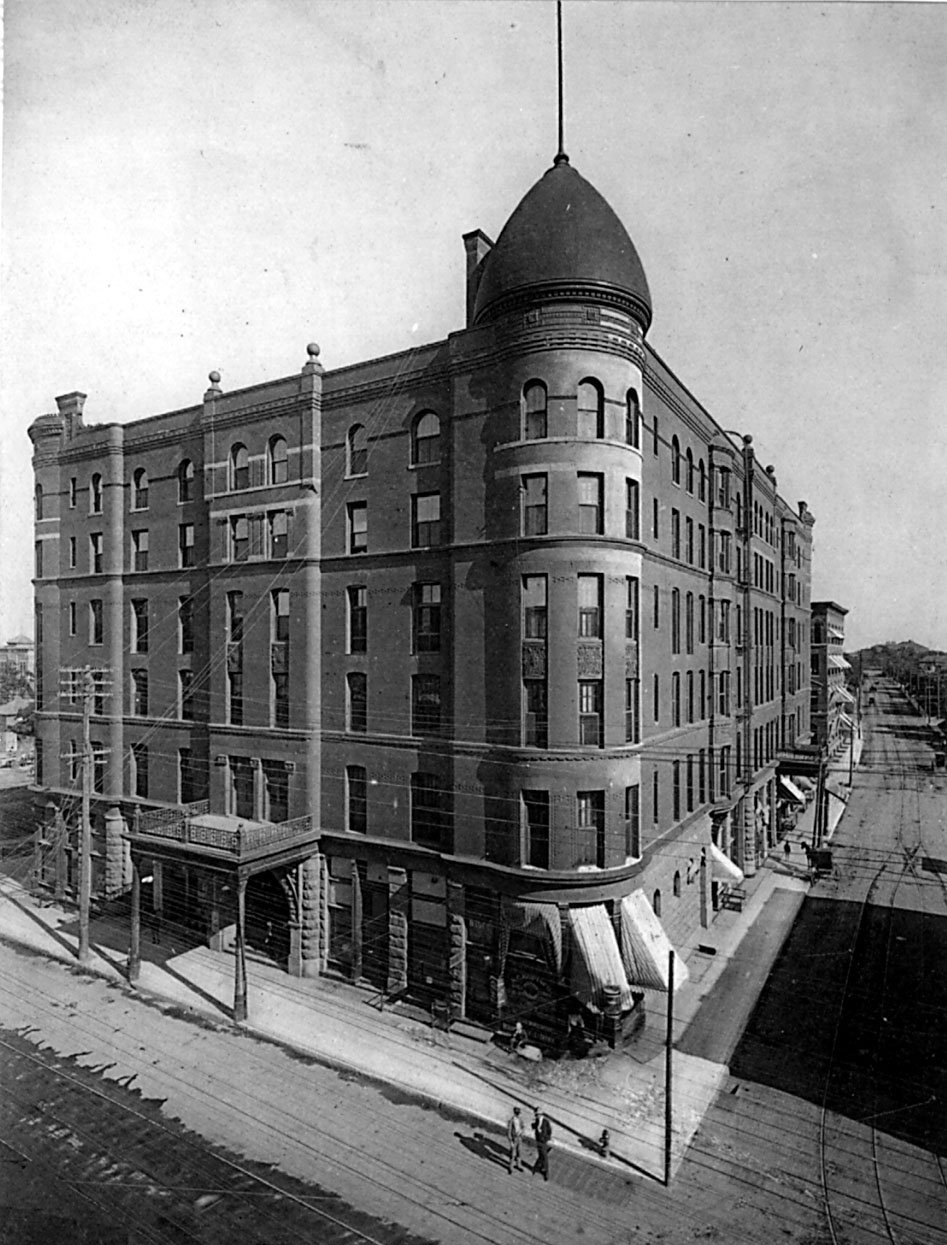
Oriental Hotel, Dallas, Texas, 1890

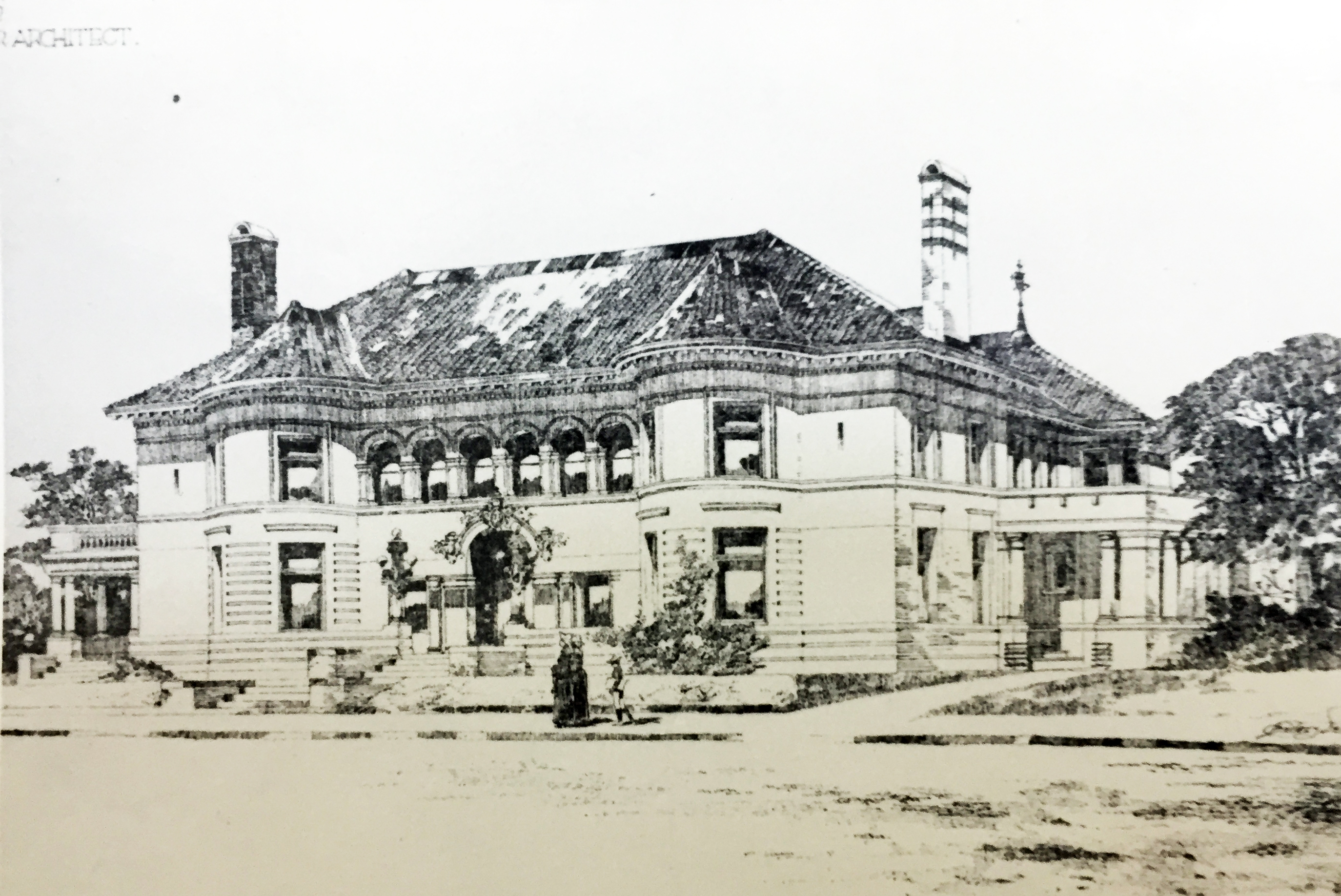
Archbishop's Residence, Catholic Archdiocese of St. Louis, 1891; demolished 1956

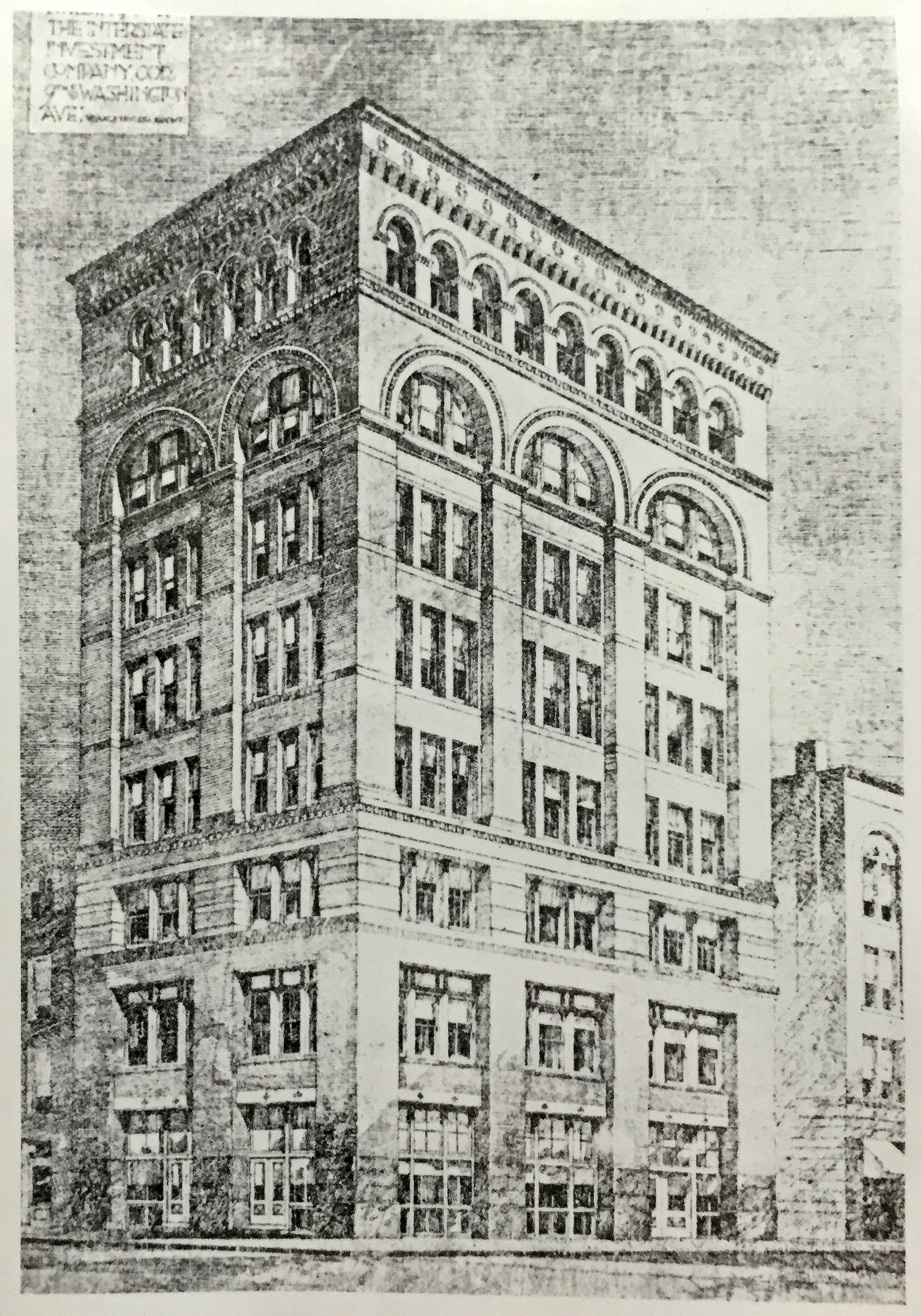
Interstate Investment Company Building, St. Louis, 1891

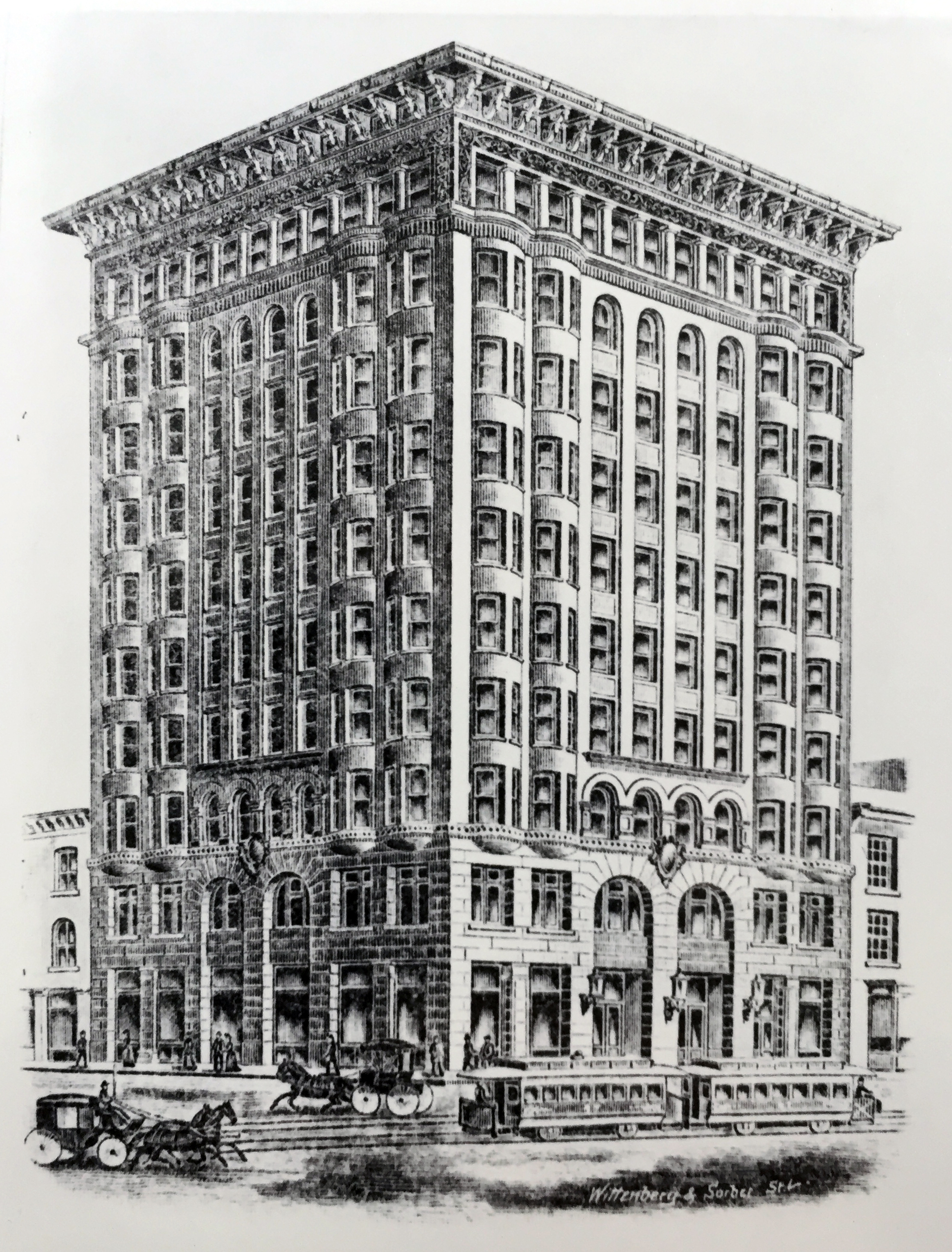
Rialto Building, St. Louis, 1892

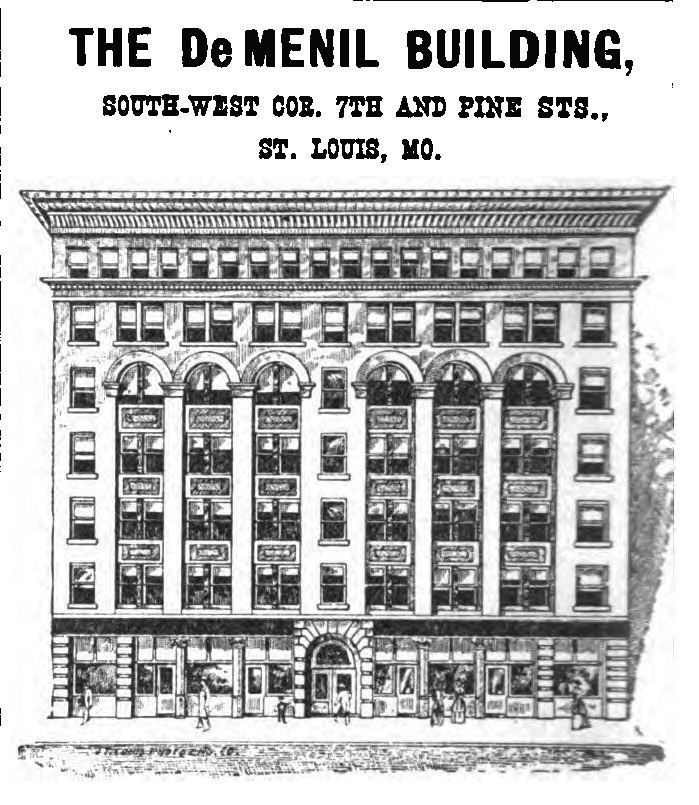
DeMenil Building, St. Louis, 1893

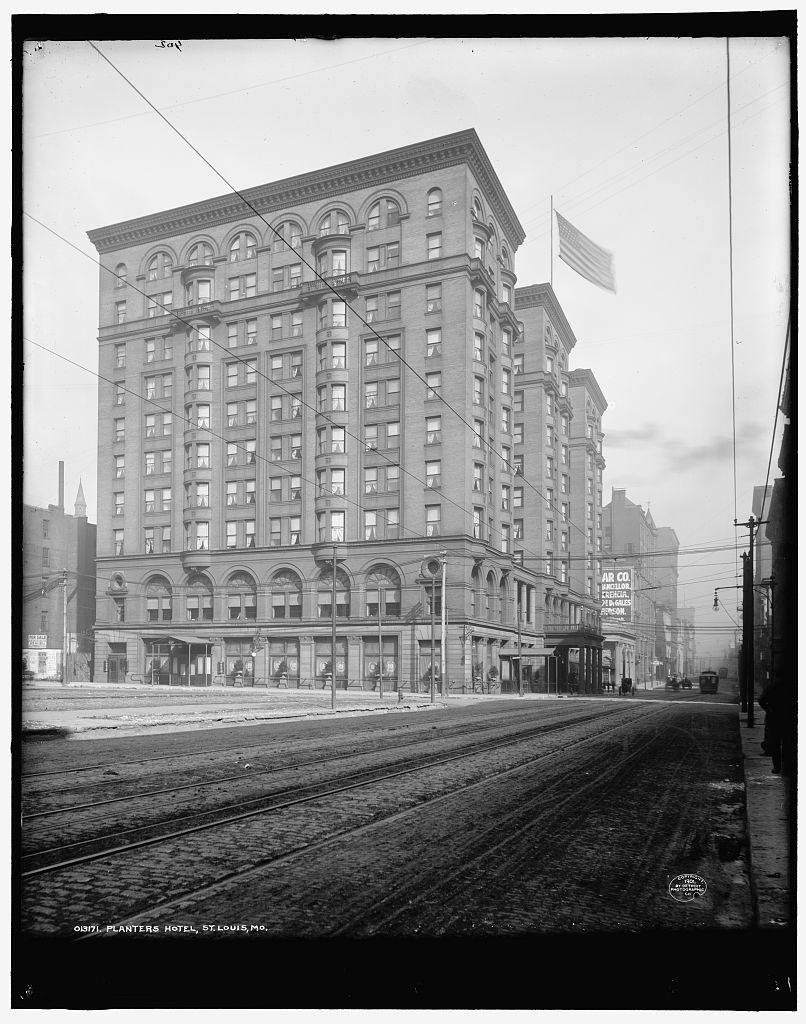
Planters Hotel, St. Louis, 1894

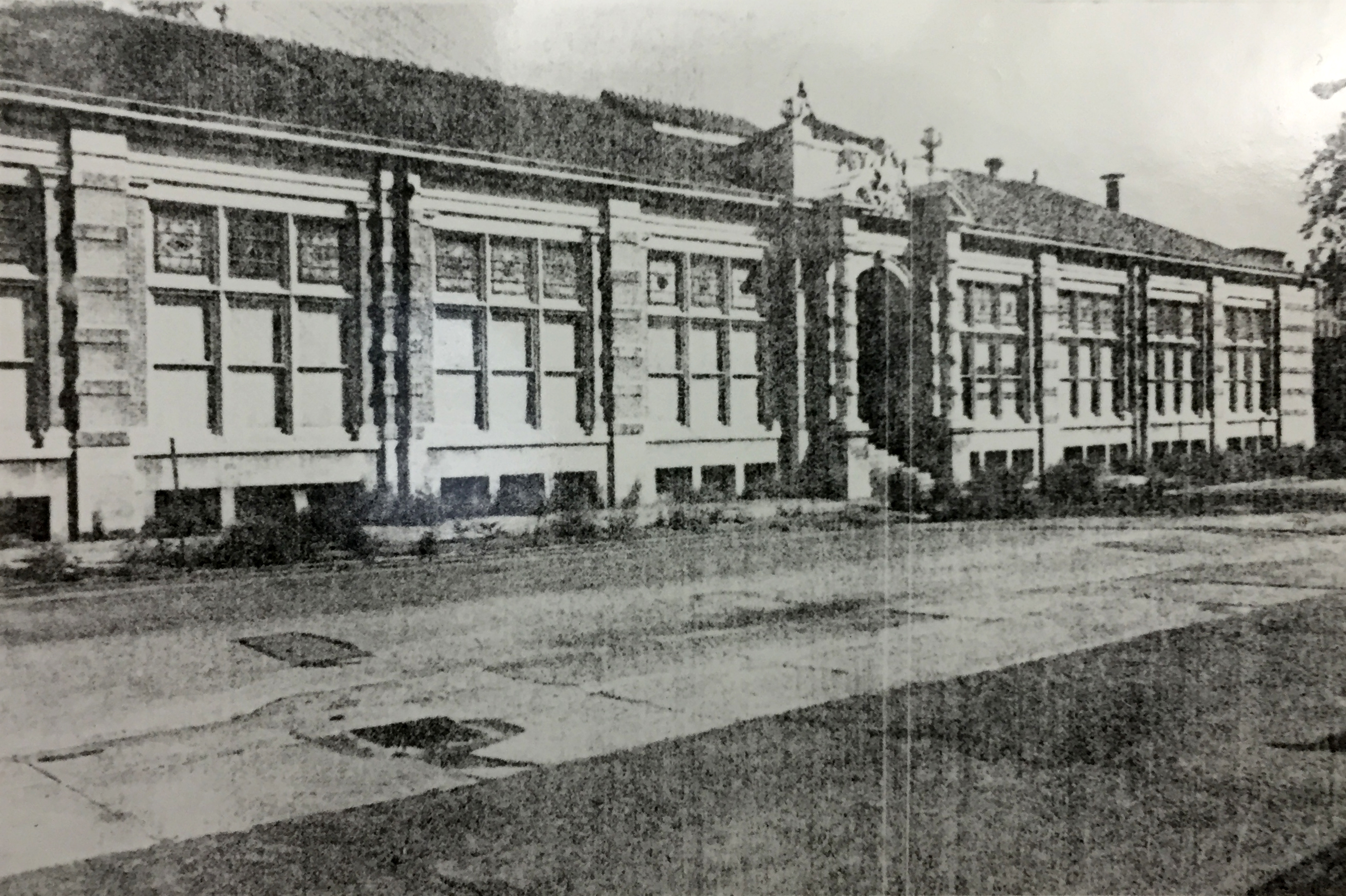
Liggett & Myers Tobacco Company Offices, Folsom Ave, St. Louis, 1896

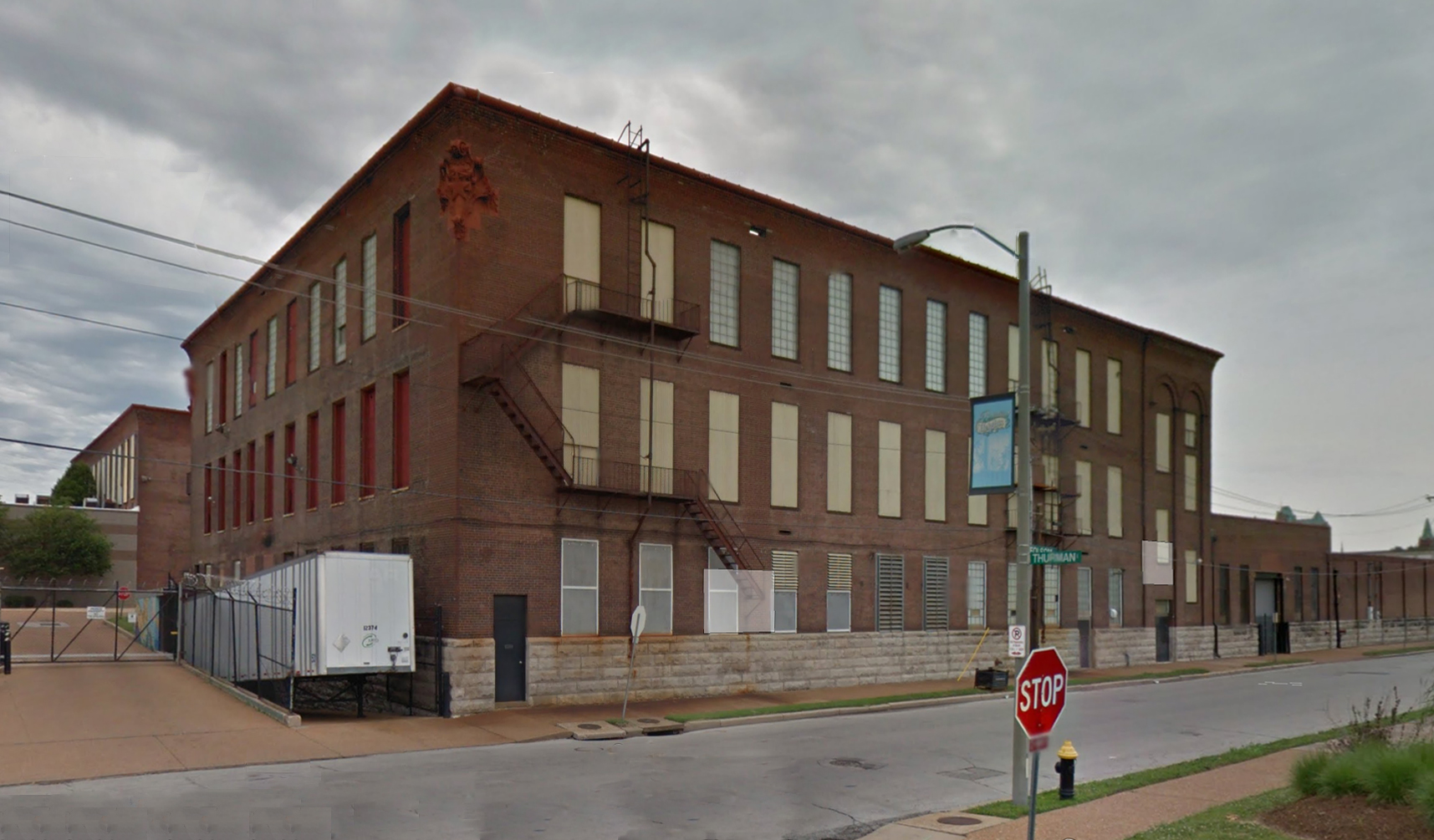
4001-71 Folsom Ave, part of the Liggett & Myers Tobacco Company Factories, St, Louis, 1896

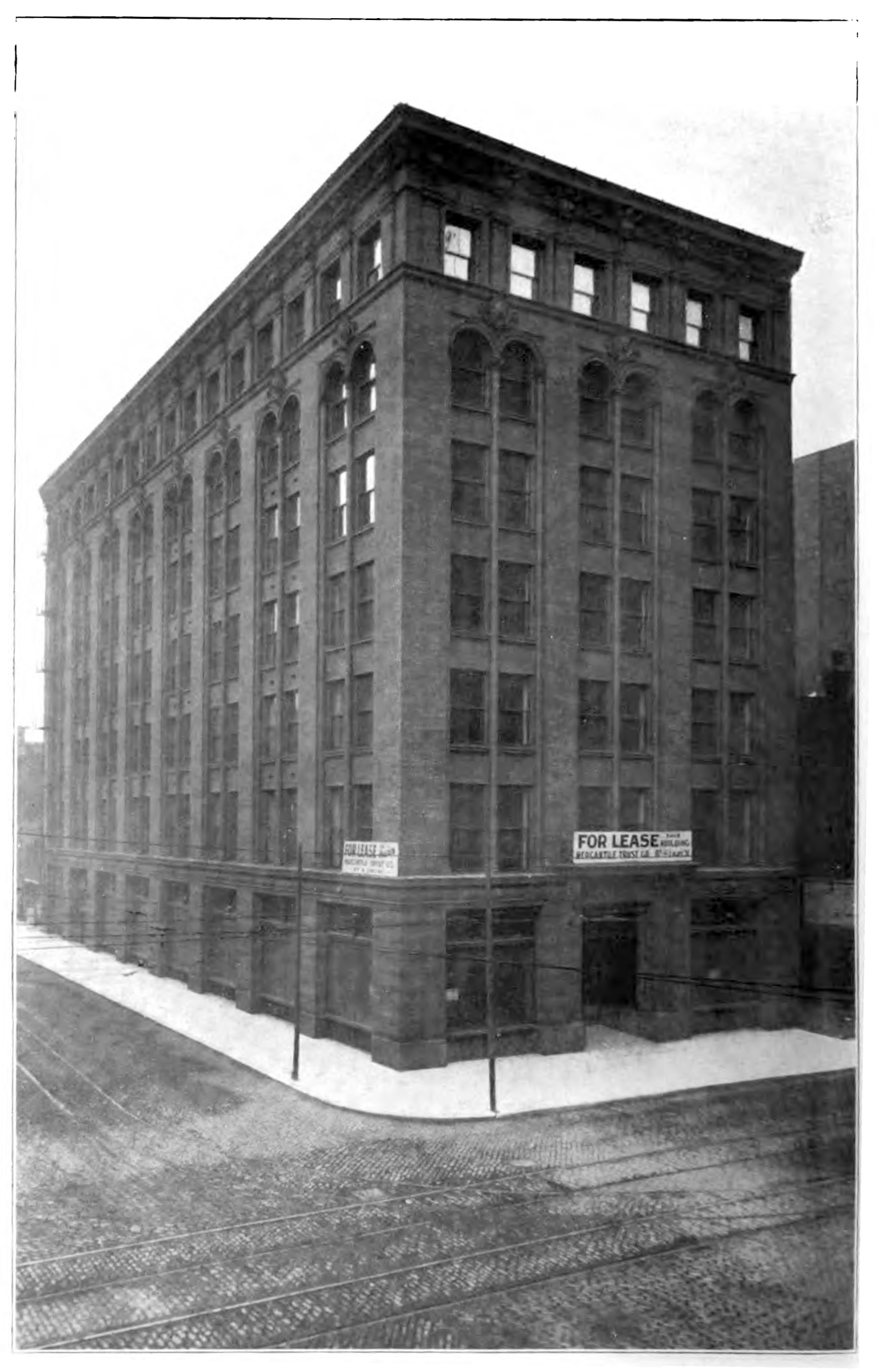
Bee Hat Company Building, St. Louis, 1899

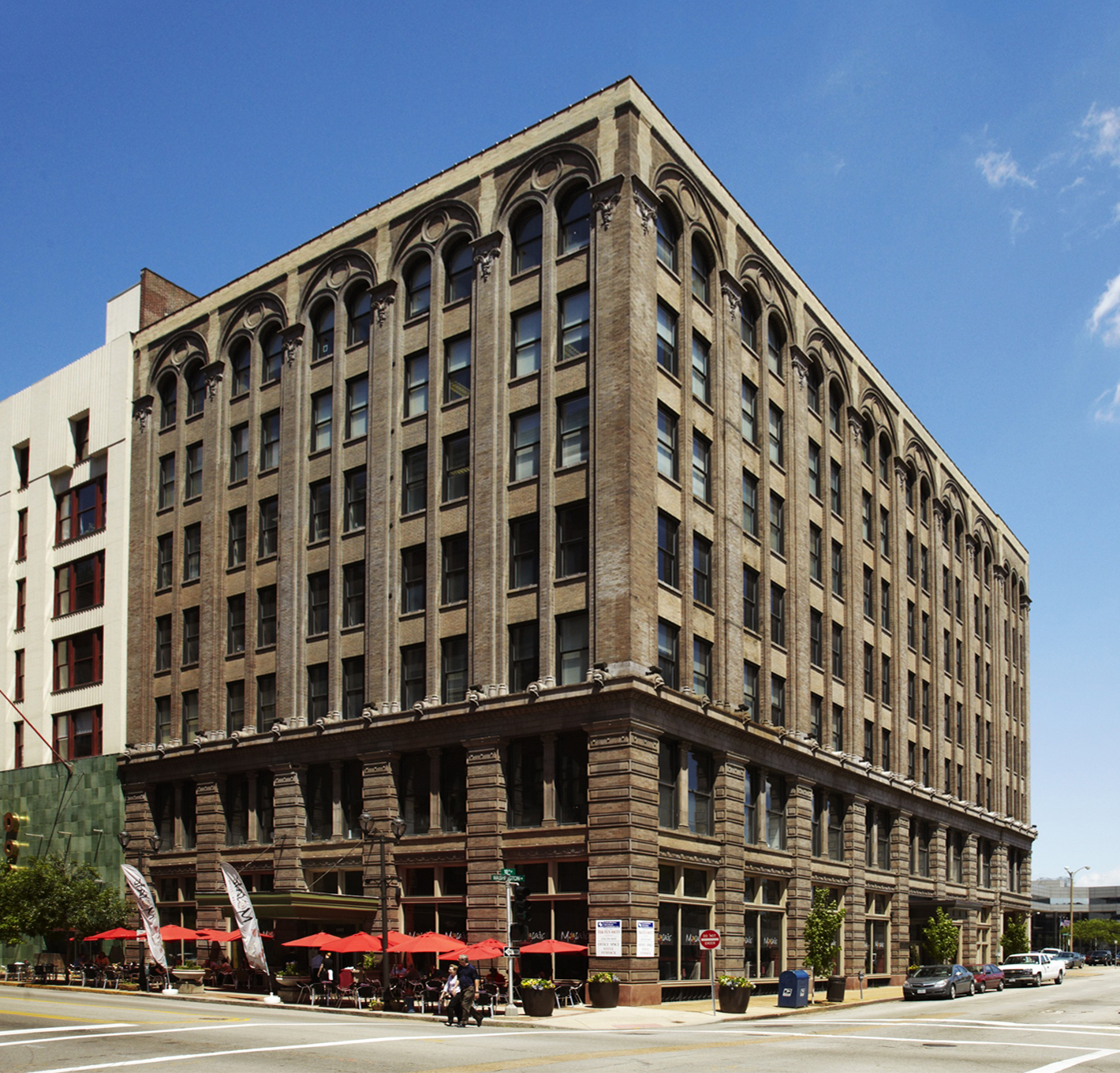
Curlee Clothing Company Building, St. Louis, 1899

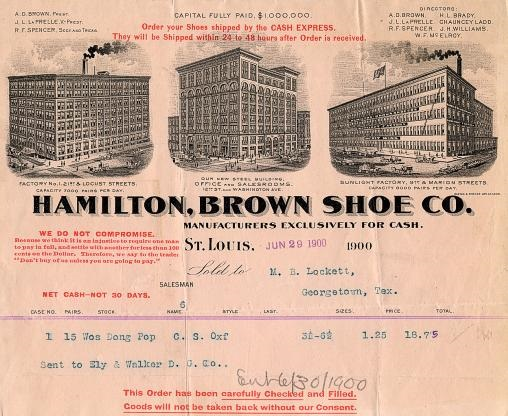
1900 receipt from Hamilton-Brown Shoe Company, St. Louis, showing headquarters and factory buildings designed by Taylor

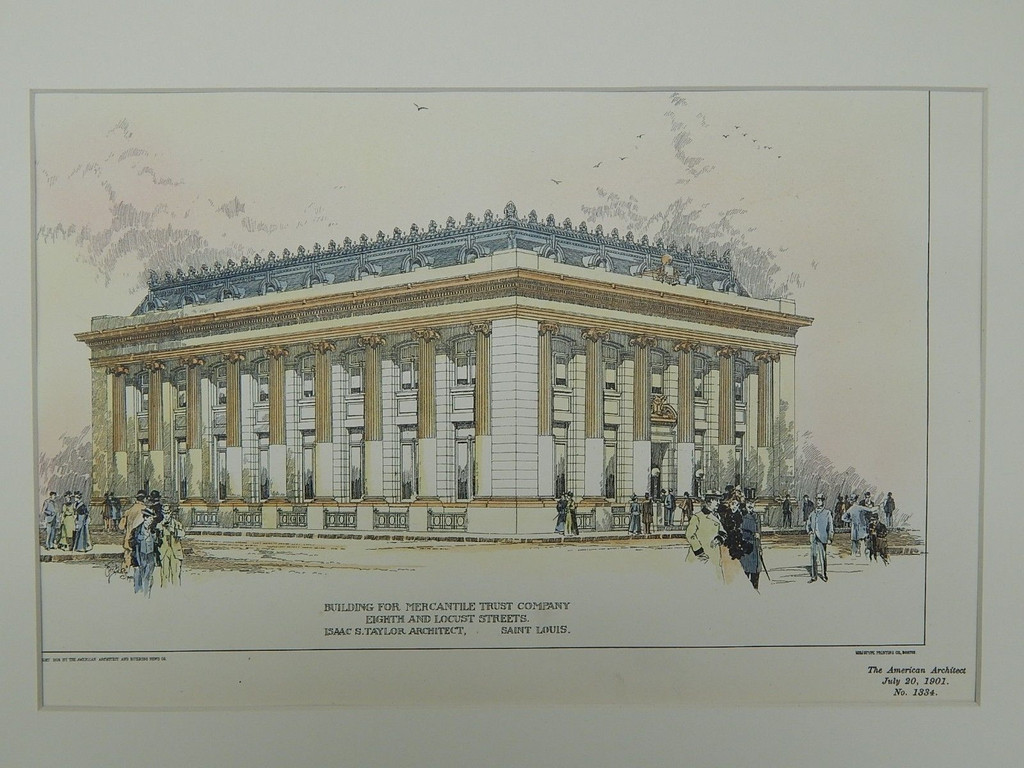
The Mercantile Trust Building, St. Louis, 1901

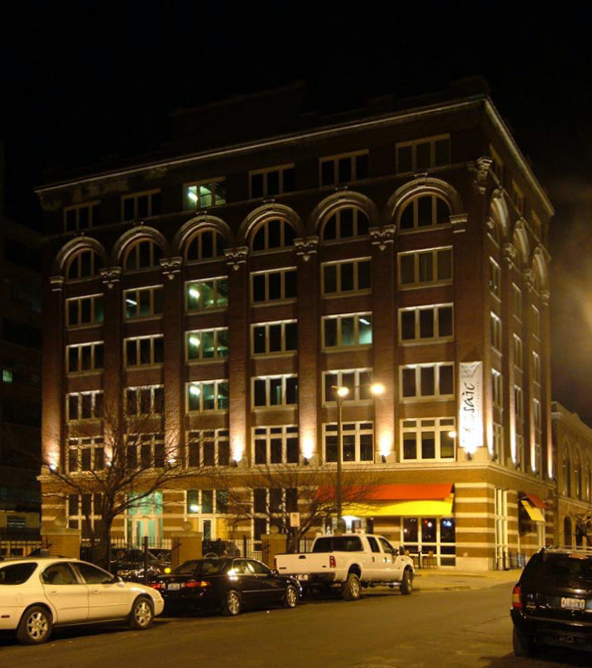
Hadley-Dean Glass Company Building, St. Louis, 1901

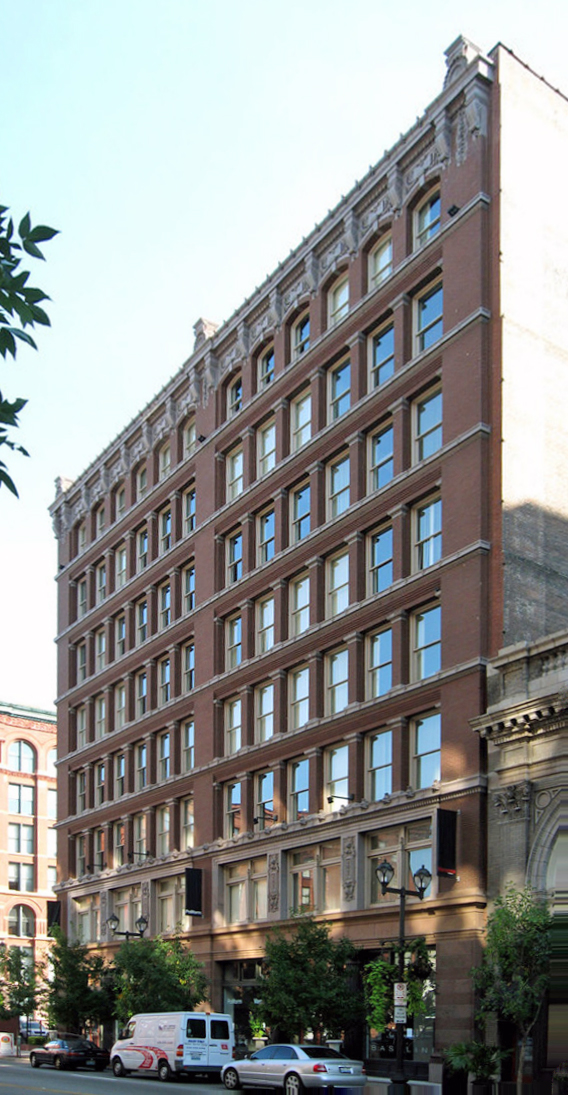
Catlin-Morton Building, St. Louis, 1901

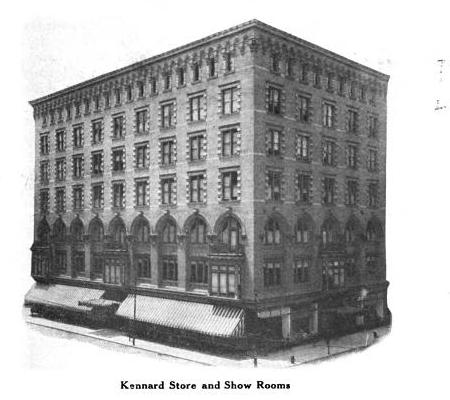
J. Kennard and Sons Carpet Company, St. Louis, 1901

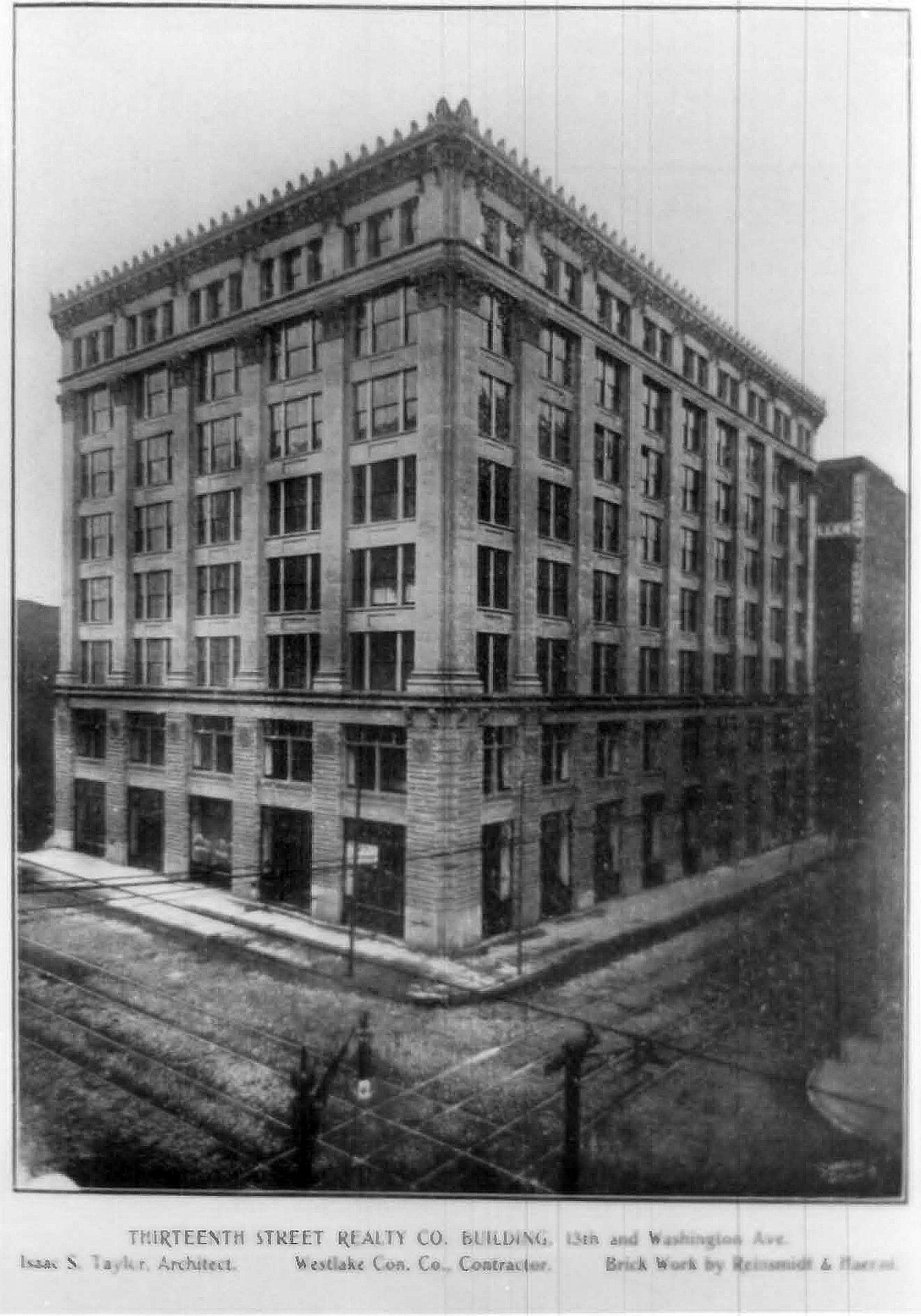
Peters Shoe Company, St. Louis, 1901

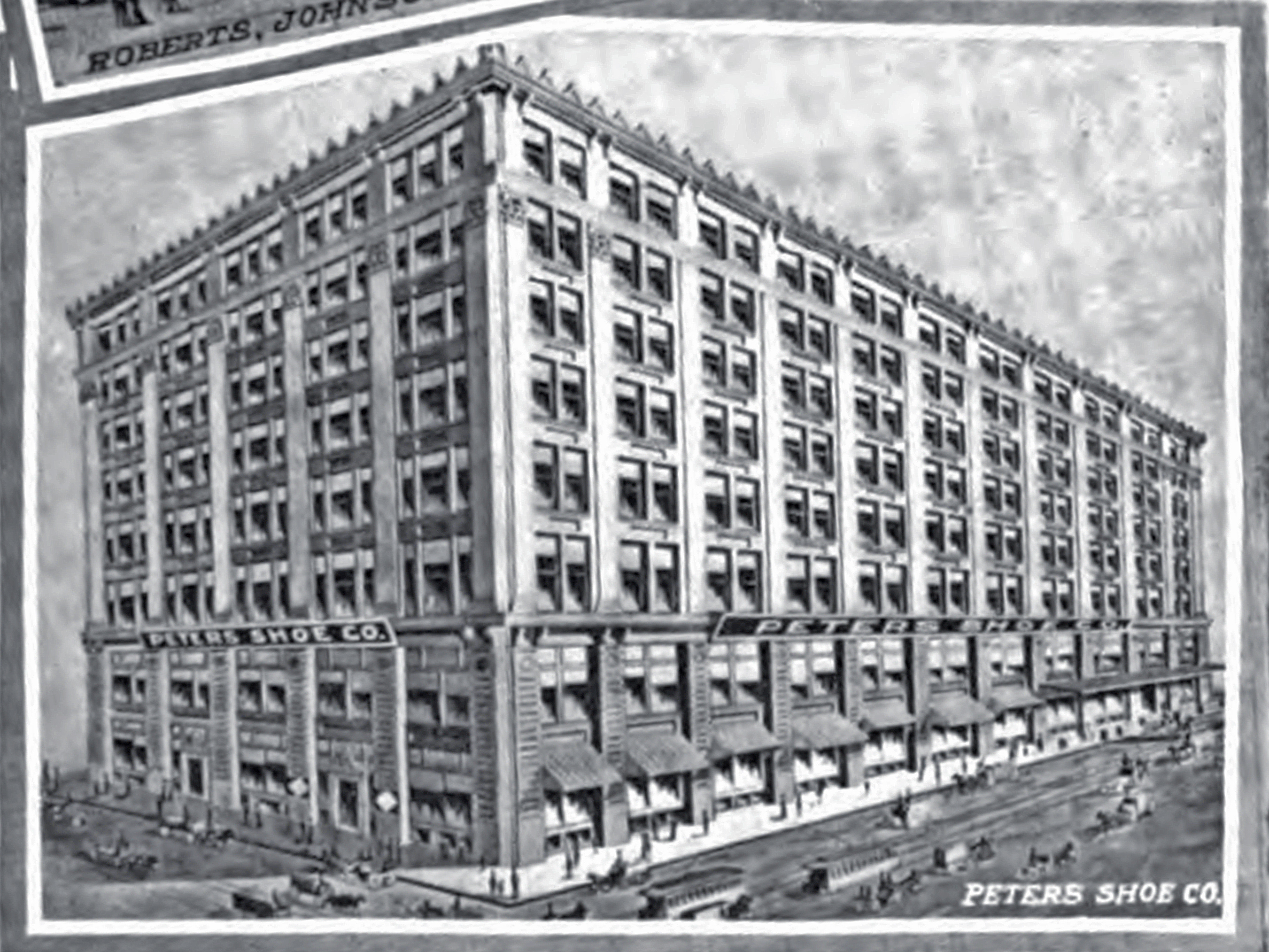
Peters Shoe Co Building, St. Louis, 1901

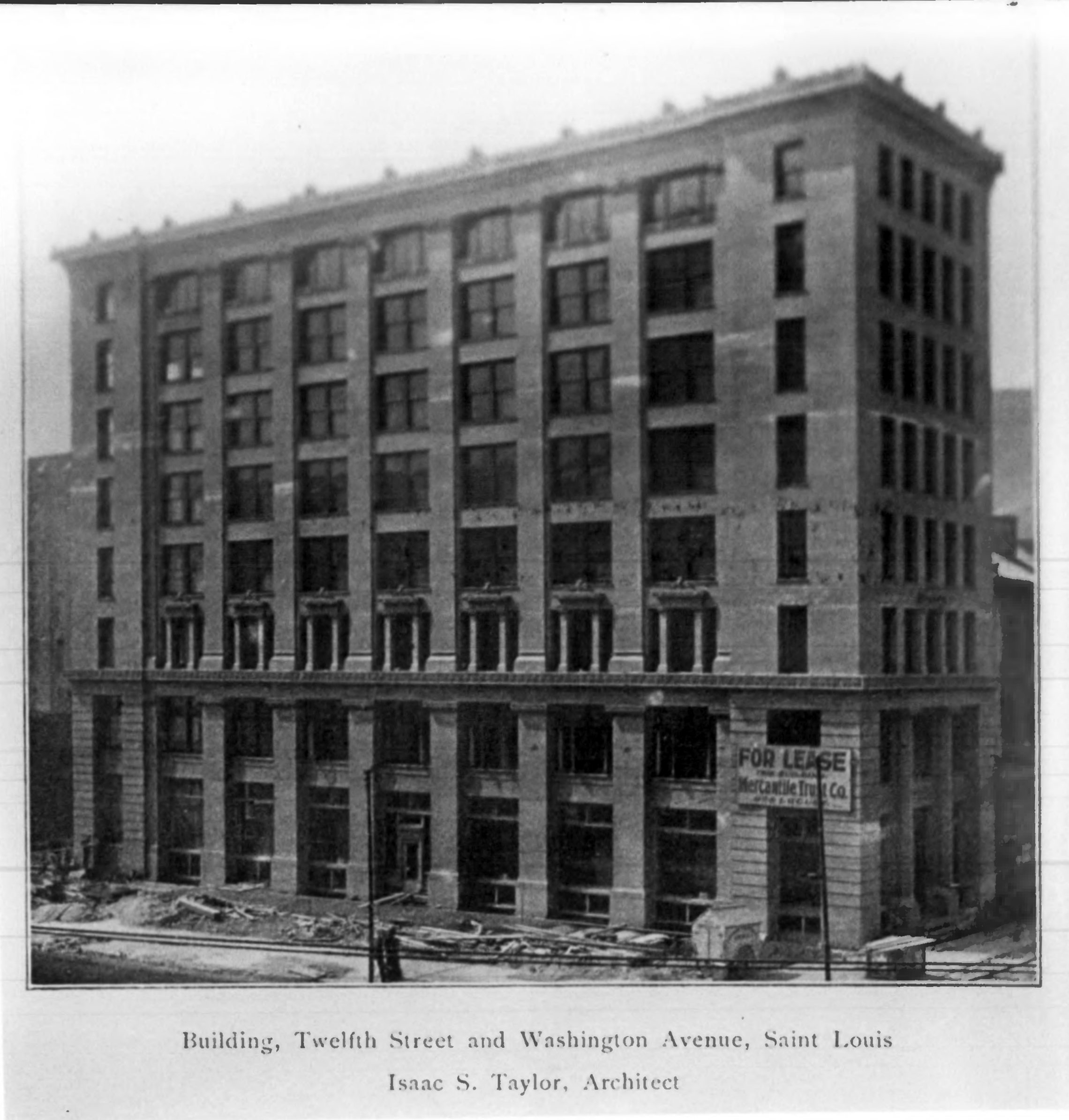
Silk Exchange Building, St. Louis, 1901–02

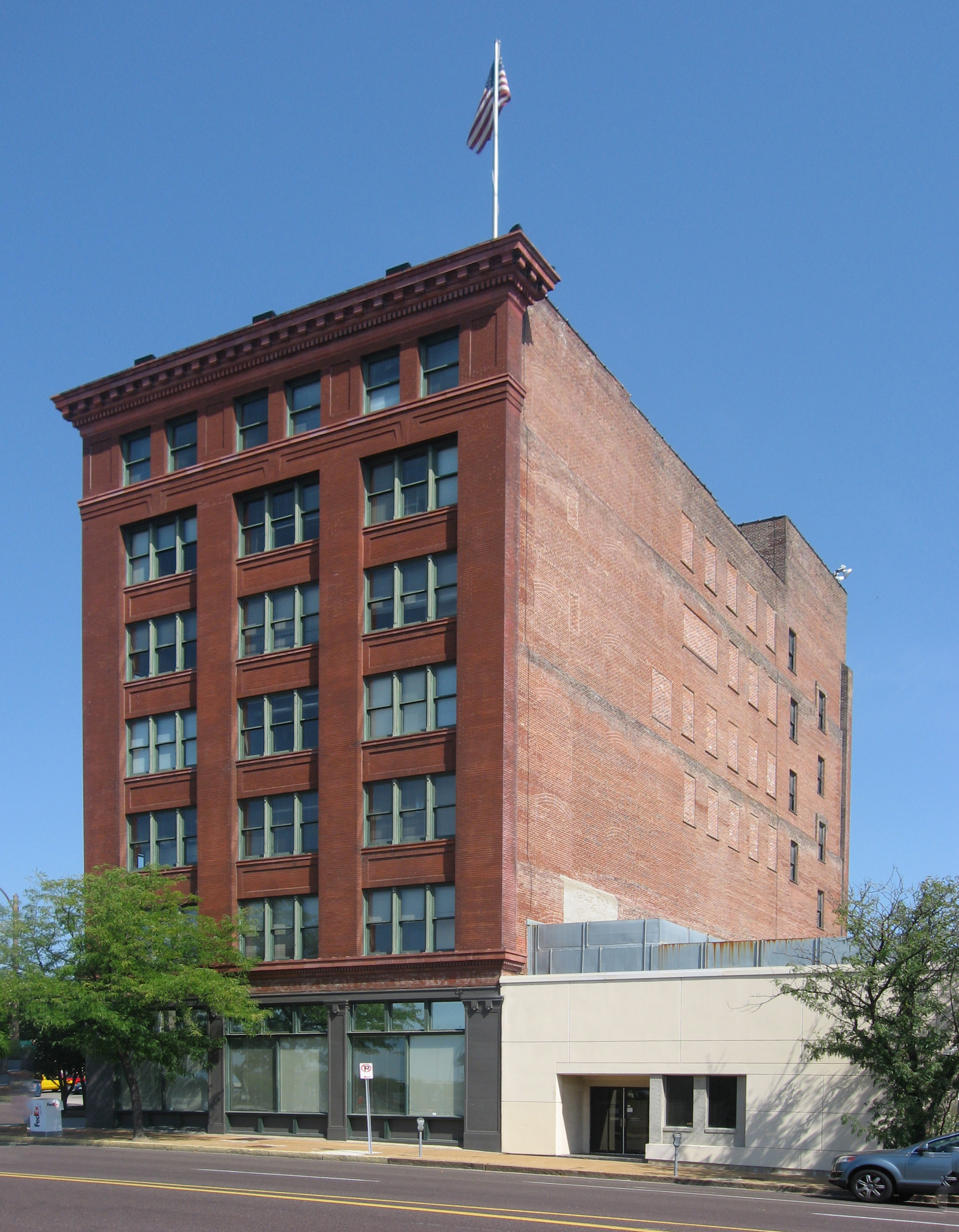
Hamilton-Brown Shoe Factory, St. Louis, 1903

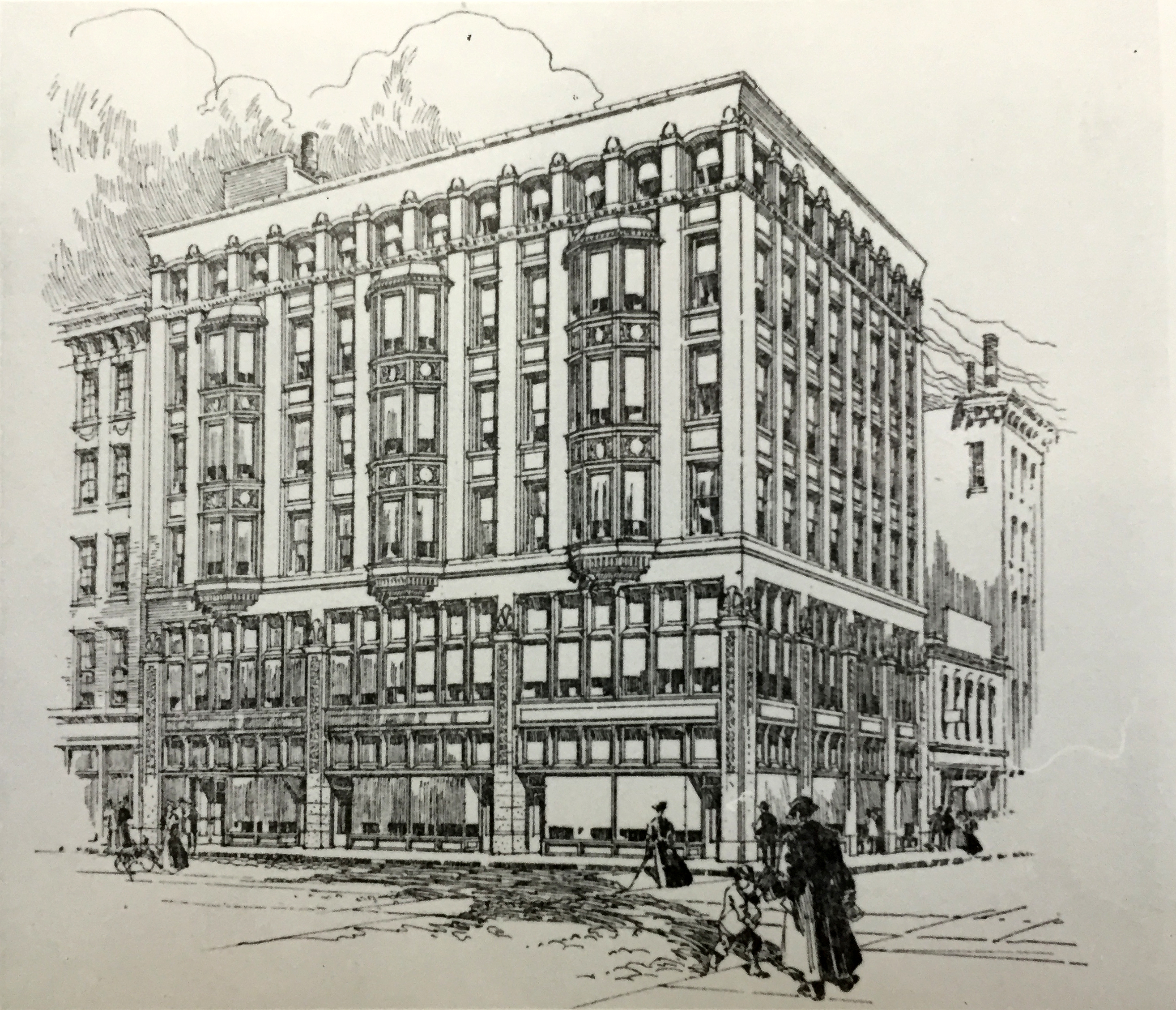
Aberdeen Building, St. Louis, 1907

== Bibliography ==
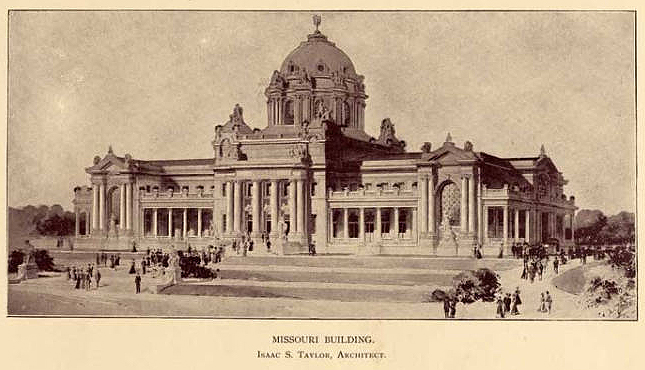
The Missouri State Building at the 1904 World's Fair in St. Louis

- Bartley, Mary. St. Louis Lost. St. Louis: Virginia Publishing, 1994.
- Bryan, John Albury. Missouri's Contribution to American Architecture. St. Louis: St. Louis Architectural Club, 1928.
- Francis, David R. The Universal Exposition of 1904: Exhibits, Architecture, Ceremonies, Amusement. St. Louis: Louisiana Purchase Exposition Company, 1904.
- Hallenburg, Heather M. "Form, Function, Fusion: The Architecture of Isaac S. Taylor, 1850-1917." M.A. Thesis, University of Missouri, 1979.
- Savage, Charles. Architecture of the Private Streets of St. Louis. Columbia, MO: University of Missouri Press, 1897.
- Tallent, Jeff. Terrace Tales: A Contemporary History of Washington Terrace, Street of Mansions. St Louis: Finbar, 1992.
- Simmons, David J. "The Architectural Career of Isaac S. Taylor," Newsletter of the Missouri Valley Chapter of the Society of Architectural Historians 17, no. 4 (Winter 2011): 1-10.
