= Charles van Ravenswaay =

American historian, museum administrator, and author

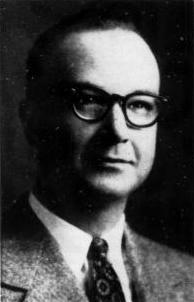
- Ravenswaay in 1953
- Born: August 10, 1911; Boonville, Missouri, US
- Died: March 20, 1990 (aged 78); Hockessin, Delaware, US
- Education: Washington University in St. Louis (AB 1933, MA 1934)
- Occupations: Historian, museum administrator
- Employer(s): Missouri Historical Society, Winterthur Museum

Charles van Ravenswaay (August 10, 1911 – March 20, 1990) was an American historian, museum administrator, and author. He served as State Superintendent of the Missouri Writer's Project, producing Missouri: The WPA Guide to the "Show Me" State in 1941. He served as director of the Missouri Historical Society from 1946–1962, director of Old Sturbridge Village from 1962–1966, and director of the Henry Francis DuPont Winterthur Museum and Gardens from 1966–1976.

== Personal life and education ==
Born in Boonville, Missouri, to a Dutch immigrant father and Anglo-American mother, van Ravenswaay attended Washington University in St. Louis, graduating with an AB in 1933 and an MA in liberal arts in 1934. He received an honorary Doctor of Humane Letters from Maryville College of the Sacred Heart in 1968 and an honorary Doctor of Humanities from the University of Missouri in 1980. In addition to these degrees and honors, Ravenswaay served as president of the American Alliance of Museums from 1961 to 1962 and received the Conservation Service Award from the U.S. Department of the Interior in 1987.

In addition to his written and political career, Ravenswaay served in the United States Navy in the North Atlantic and South Pacific theaters during World War II from 1942 to 1946. As a Navy lieutenant commander in the Pacific, he met many different people from different cultures. In particular, he wrote home to his friends and family that he was fascinated with the customs of the aboriginal Australians.

Throughout his life, Ravenswaay spent much time studying the history and tradition of the St. Louis area. His hobbies for learning about the history and botany began early on in his life. From a very young age, he studied the architecture and decoration within many of the prominent historic buildings. He befriended many of families who were the descendants of many St. Louis prominent families, and listened to their oral traditions and stories from the past.

Likewise, Ravenswaay was very passionate about botany and landscape, and so many of his works includes his reflections on his point of view on such activities. In one of his travels, he took the time of identified the flowers, garden crops, and grape varieties that have been brought over from Germany to the vicinity of Hermann, Missouri. He even said that he believed it to be possible to develop historic gardens and grape arbors based on the plants that he identified in the early 1800s German community.

== Written work ==
Van Ravenswaay has published four books: The Arts and Architecture of German Settlements in Missouri: A Survey of a Vanishing Culture (University of Missouri Press, 1977); A Nineteenth Century Garden (Main Street Press/Universe Books, 1977); Drawn from Nature. The Botanical Art of Joseph Prestele and His Sons (Smithsonian Institution Press, 1984); and St. Louis: An Informal History of the City and Its People, 1764-1865 (Missouri Historical Society Press, 1991). In addition, he co-authored the book A Guide to the Show Me State in 1941.

Each has been recognized in its own right for its historical acumen and depictions. Though perhaps not having reach the national notoriety as some of their competitors, each of Ravenswaay's books contain a lifetime of study and passion. His book Drawn from Nature was the result of Ravenswaay's great passion for gardening and botany, while his passion for historical buildings and decorative arts led to his writing of The Arts and Architecture of German Settlements in Missouri.
