= Burnett Anderson Memorial Award for Excellence in Numismatic Writing =

Annual American award for numismatics

- Country: United States of America
- Presented by: American Numismatic Association, American Numismatic Society
- First award: 1999; 27 years ago
- Website: numismatics.org/burnettandersonwinners/

The Burnett Anderson Memorial Award for Excellence in Numismatic Writing is an annual award for numismatics. Presented annually to an author, journalist or researcher in recognition of their career contributions to the hobby, the award is sponsored by Krause Publications, and the winner is selected in a cooperative process by the American Numismatic Association (ANA), the American Numismatic Society (ANS) and the Numismatic Literary Guild (NLG).

== Recipients ==
Year	Recipient
1999	Burnett Anderson
2000	Q. David Bowers
2001	Eric Newman
2002	Robert Julian
2003	Edward Rochette
2004	Margo Russell
2005	Clifford Mishler
2006	Beth Deisher
2007	David Harper
2008	Wayne Homren
2009	Chester Krause
2010	David Alexander
2011	Thomas DeLorey
2012	Robert Wilson Hoge
2013	Paul Gilkes
2014	Ed Reiter
2015	Ursula Kampmann
2016	Scott Travers
2017	Donn Pearlman
2018	Kenneth Bressett
2019	Peterban Alfen
2020	Oliver Hoover
2021	Joel Orosz
2022	David Hendin
2023	David W. Lange
2024	Ute Wartenberg
2025	David Schenkman
2026	Peter Van Alfen
