= Numismatic Scrapbook Magazine =

United States magazine for coin collectors

Numismatic Scrapbook
- Publisher: Hewitt Bros., Amos Press
- First issue: January 1935
- Final issue: January 1976
- Country: United States
- Language: en-US
- ISSN: 0029-6058

Numismatic Scrapbook Magazine was an American special-interest publication that ran from 1935 until 1976.

== History ==
=== Early years ===
Founded by Lee F. Hewitt in January 1935, the first issue featured eight pages, and was printed to the tune of 200 copies, with subscriptions costing one dollar a year.

Hewitt's original plan for the magazine was to create a literal "scrapbook" publication; that is, it would include information from out-of-print books, as well as notable current news and notices. With the coin collecting boom in the 1930s, and buoyed by the ever-increasing number of commemorative coins the United States Mint churned out during that decade, the magazine reached new heights. Soon Hewitt was able to add news bulletins to the mix. R.W. Julian, Kenneth L. Hallenbeck, and Walter Breen contributed to the magazine during its run.

The magazine has been cited as a major contributor to the growth of coin collecting from a scholarly pursuit to a hobby.

As a for-profit publication, it ran over 300 pages at its peak, with its main competition being the American Numismatic Association's journal, The Numismatist.

Numismatic Scrapbook Magazine was the first numismatic publication to publish photographs of the 1942/41 Mercury dime, in the March 1943 issue.

=== Decline and Folding ===
In the 1960s, Hewitt contracted Amos Media to print the magazine for him. Editor Russell Rulau, who was appointed editor in 1968, disliked U.S. coins, focusing more on his role at World Coins instead. Despite attempts to revamp the magazine, by 1975, rising printing costs combined with increased competition from Amos' Coin World and World Coin News from Krause Publications, forced Amos Media to discontinue the magazine in January 1976.

The entire run of issues is archived on the Newman Numismatic Portal but is not available as it is still in-copyright.
