= John Jay Pittman =

- Born: February 18, 1913; Chase City, Virginia, U.S.
- Died: February 17, 1996 (aged 82); Rochester, New York, U.S.
- Occupations: Chemical engineer, numismatist
- Known for: Coin collecting; service to the American Numismatic Association
- Spouse: Gehring Cooper
- Children: John Jay Jr., Polly, and Betsy
- Awards: Farran Zerbe Memorial Award (1980); American Numismatic Association Hall of Fame (1992); Numismatic News Numismatic Ambassador (1995)

John Jay Pittman (February 18, 1913 – February 17, 1996) was an American chemical engineer, coin collector, numismatist, and longtime officer of the American Numismatic Association (ANA). He served as president of the ANA from 1971 to 1973 and was a member of its board of governors for much of the period from 1959 through 1989. He was also a prominent exhibitor, displaying portions of his collection at coin conventions and club meetings for decades.

Pittman assembled a large and diverse collection of United States and world coins over more than five decades. Although he worked for Eastman Kodak in Rochester, New York, for more than 35 years, he was not independently wealthy and built his collection by emphasizing knowledge, research, and opportunities to acquire relatively undervalued coins. After his death, the collection was sold in three public auctions conducted by numismatist David W. Akers from 1997 to 1999.

== Early life and education ==
Pittman was the eldest of seven children. His father worked for the railroad and later became a barber, while his mother was a teacher. The family lived in modest circumstances in Rocky Mount, North Carolina, during Pittman's childhood. According to a family biography written by his daughter Polly Edwards Pittman, he did not come from a wealthy background and began working at a young age. As a child, he worked on a farm and later sold newspapers and collected discarded postage stamps.

His interest in coins began during his childhood, when his grandmother gave him old coins. He later recalled becoming fascinated by the people, history, and distant places represented by coins.

As a teenager, Pittman traveled extensively on his own. According to the family account, at age 13 he rode freight trains as far as Wyoming before returning home for school. The following summer he traveled to New York City, where he worked on the docks, in the garment district, and eventually as a runner on Wall Street.

He attended the University of North Carolina at Chapel Hill, initially intending to become a physician. Because of financial obligations associated with his education, however, he chose chemical engineering, which allowed him to complete his education and begin supporting his younger siblings. He worked in restaurants throughout college and, during school breaks, held other jobs, including as a soda jerk and in tobacco auctioneering barns. He later spent a summer in graduate study at Princeton University before beginning his professional career.

== Career ==
After completing his education, Pittman worked briefly in Akron, Ohio. In January 1936, he moved to Rochester, New York, after accepting a position with Eastman Kodak Company. He remained with Kodak for more than 35 years and took early retirement in 1971.

His background in chemical engineering and his professional career provided the financial foundation for his collecting, but Pittman did not accumulate his collection through great personal wealth. Both his daughter and David W. Akers, who later cataloged the collection, emphasized that he operated within a relatively limited budget.

Pittman deliberately avoided concentrating his resources on famous but extremely expensive rarities such as the 1804 dollar, 1894-S Barber dime, and 1913 Liberty Head nickel. Instead, he sought coins that were comparably rare but less highly valued by the market. Early United States proof coins became a particular specialty because they were comparatively affordable during the 1940s and 1950s.

== Numismatics ==
=== Early collecting ===
Pittman became seriously involved in numismatics in the early 1940s. In 1943, he joined the American Numismatic Association; George J. Bauer, Floyd Newell, and William Hutcheson sponsored his membership application. He subsequently became an ANA life member.

He corresponded with major coin dealers and began acquiring auction catalogs, price lists, and reference books before making substantial purchases. Among the dealers with whom he developed relationships were B. Max Mehl, Abe Kosoff, Sol Kaplan, James P. Kelly, Barney Bluestone, George Bauer, David Bullowa, Abner Kreisberg, Charles Wormser, Stack's, Michael Kolman, Jim Charlton, and Wayte Raymond.

Akers wrote that Pittman began seriously acquiring coins in the early 1940s and became an active participant in major auctions. His early purchases included coins from the 1946 "World's Greatest Collection" and William C. Atwater sales. At the 1947 sale of the Will W. Neil Collection, conducted by B. Max Mehl, Pittman purchased an 1802 half dime.

=== Collecting and acquisitions ===
Pittman's collection developed over more than five decades and encompassed United States and world coinage. Although he generally did not collect ancient and medieval coins, his holdings included extensive material from Canada, Great Britain, Cuba, Russia, Japan, Sweden, Mexico, South Africa, Australia, and other countries.

Some Pittman acquisitions and prices realized
Coin	Purchase price	Realized price
1794 Liberty Cap half cent	$24	$4,675
1795 Draped Bust dollar	$42	$13,200
1807 Draped Bust dime	$11	$49,500
1834 Capped Bust half dollar	$20.50	$14,300

Obverse of a 1907 Liberty Head double eagle, graded PR65 Cameo. John Jay Pittman purchased the coin privately from Max L. Justus on November 22, 1959, for $945; it later hammered for $60,500 in the 1997 Pittman Collection auction.

Pittman also traveled extensively outside the United States with his wife. They visited many mints around the world to observe how they operated.

Early United States proof coinage became one of his principal specialties. Akers described him as particularly interested in rare proof coins and noted that Pittman deliberately avoided concentrating his resources on famous but extremely expensive rarities such as the 1804 dollar, 1894-S Barber dime, and 1913 Liberty Head nickel. Instead, he sought coins that were comparably rare but less highly valued by the market. Jeff Garrett similarly wrote that Pittman avoided "mega rarities" and focused on coins he believed were undervalued. Early United States proofs were relatively affordable when Pittman began collecting them in the 1940s and 1950s, allowing him to acquire significant examples within his means.

In a 1986 interview with David Lisot, Pittman advised new collectors to learn as much as possible, "look at thousands of coins and paper bills," and develop the ability to grade for themselves. He said, "if it happens to be in your field and you desperately want it and can't afford it, I would say buy it." Pittman estimated that about 95 percent of world coins would eventually come onto the market again, but would generally cost more each time they reappeared. He also regarded the people and friendships encountered through collecting as one of the hobby's greatest rewards.

Pittman emphasized the importance of books and study, citing former ANA president George J. Bauer as the person from whom he had learned the most. Pittman recalled that Bauer could speak German, taught himself Latin and Greek, and could read Greek and Roman coins. He remembered Bauer as exceptionally well-read and knowledgeable about numismatics.

Pittman's collecting extended beyond major auction purchases. He bought coins directly from dealers and individuals, and after retiring from Eastman Kodak in 1971, he increasingly acquired coins through trades, exchanging pieces from his collection for coins he considered more desirable. He also paid close attention to pedigrees and provenance. When cataloging the collection after Pittman's death, Akers reconstructed the histories of many coins from Pittman's envelopes, ledgers, invoices, and earlier auction catalogs.

Pittman accumulated his collection gradually over many years rather than through substantial inherited wealth. Both his family and Akers emphasized that he built the collection while working as a salaried chemical engineer at Eastman Kodak and operated within relatively limited financial resources. Garrett likewise described Pittman as a student of numismatics who assembled his collection slowly over many years, taking advantage of opportunities as they arose. An article published in Numismatic News similarly described Pittman's method as buying one coin at a time over many years.

=== Palace Collections of Egypt sale ===
The Palace Collections of Egypt auction, held in Cairo in 1954 following the overthrow of King Farouk, was a major event in Pittman's collecting career. Pittman and his wife, Gehring, traveled to Egypt to attend the sale.

John J. Pittman examining a coin at the 1954 Palace Collections of Egypt sale

According to Akers, Pittman financed the trip and his purchases by taking out a second mortgage on the family's home. His expenditure at the sale was substantially larger than any previous purchase he had made. He eventually repaid the mortgage, in part by selling some of his proof coins. Garrett likewise reported that Pittman traveled to Cairo for the sale and mortgaged his home to finance his bidding.

In the interview with Lisot, Pittman recalled helping assemble a group of American collectors and dealers who traveled to Cairo for the auction. Because of political instability in Egypt, the participants arranged insurance and planned to remove their purchases from the country, often the same day. Pittman also recalled that the collectors and dealers coordinated their interests in advance, agreeing on some lots they intended to pursue to avoid directly competing where possible.

Pittman particularly sought British Empire material. He and fellow collector Emery May Holden Norweb both wanted a British Columbia $20 gold piece and agreed to submit sealed bids through different representatives, with Pittman represented by Fred Baldwin and Norweb by Spink. Norweb ultimately withdrew from the bidding, and Pittman acquired the coin. He later recalled that he regarded many of the American coins in the sale as pieces that could eventually be acquired elsewhere, whereas opportunities to obtain certain foreign and colonial material in such quantity and at comparable prices might not come again.

=== Collection and dispersal ===
Pittman's collection grew into one of the largest and most diverse privately assembled holdings of United States and world coins. It included extensive holdings of early United States proof gold, British proof patterns and other British coinage, Japanese coins, Canadian rarities, and Mexican and South African coinage.

Following Pittman's death in 1996, David W. Akers cataloged and sold the collection in three public auctions between 1997 and 1999. The sales comprised more than 12,000 lots and included United States and world coins as well as paper money, medals, and tokens. The collection realized more than $40 million across the three auctions.

The auction catalogs preserved extensive information about Pittman's collecting activities and the provenance of individual pieces. Akers used Pittman's records, coin envelopes, ledgers, invoices, and earlier auction catalogs to reconstruct many of the collection's pedigrees.

=== Exhibiting and education ===
Pittman was an active numismatic exhibitor. He displayed coins at local coin clubs, regional and state shows, ANA conventions, and other numismatic gatherings for decades. Many of his displays were reported in The Numismatist during the 1940s and 1950s. According to Akers, Pittman frequently received first-place and best-of-show awards for his displays. In later years, he increasingly exhibited outside competitive categories because he did not want his repeated success to discourage other collectors from exhibiting.

In 1982, Pittman exhibited a selection of English and British Empire patterns and proofs dating from 1662 onward at the Greater New York Coin Convention in New York City. The exhibition was described at the time as the first occasion on which he had displayed that particular selection from his collection. Pittman also participated in the convention's educational forum.

His interest in displaying coins extended beyond formal competition. Pittman frequently showed individual coins to other collectors and dealers, discussing their history and characteristics with them. Akers described the informal "show-and-tell" aspect of collecting as one of Pittman's greatest pleasures.

Pittman's knowledge also made him a source of information for other collectors. His reputation for remembering the details of coins, transactions, and previous owners contributed to his standing among collectors and professional numismatists.

=== American Numismatic Association ===
Pittman was deeply involved in the American Numismatic Association for much of his adult life. He served on its board of governors beginning in 1959 and was elected as its 37th president in 1971, serving through 1973.

==== Hobby Protection Act ====
John Jay Pittman (far left), then president of the American Numismatic Association, testifies before the House Subcommittee on Commerce and Finance on February 28, 1973, with other numismatic leaders advocating for protective legislation.

During Pittman's presidency, the ANA participated in efforts to obtain federal legislation protecting collectors and dealers from fraudulent or misleading reproductions of coins and other numismatic items. On February 28, 1973, Pittman was among six leading figures in the numismatic hobby who testified before the Commerce and Finance Subcommittee of the U.S. House Interstate and Foreign Commerce Committee concerning proposed hobby-protection legislation. Virgil Hancock led the hobbyists' testimony, with Pittman and the other witnesses supporting the proposed legislation. The House passed H.R. 5777, the Hobby Protection Act, by a vote of 382–7 on May 16, 1973. After a legislative dispute over unrelated Senate amendments, the measure was cleared for the White House and became law on November 29, 1973.

A later account described Pittman as instrumental in working with Congress to pass the act.

==== Bicentennial coinage ====
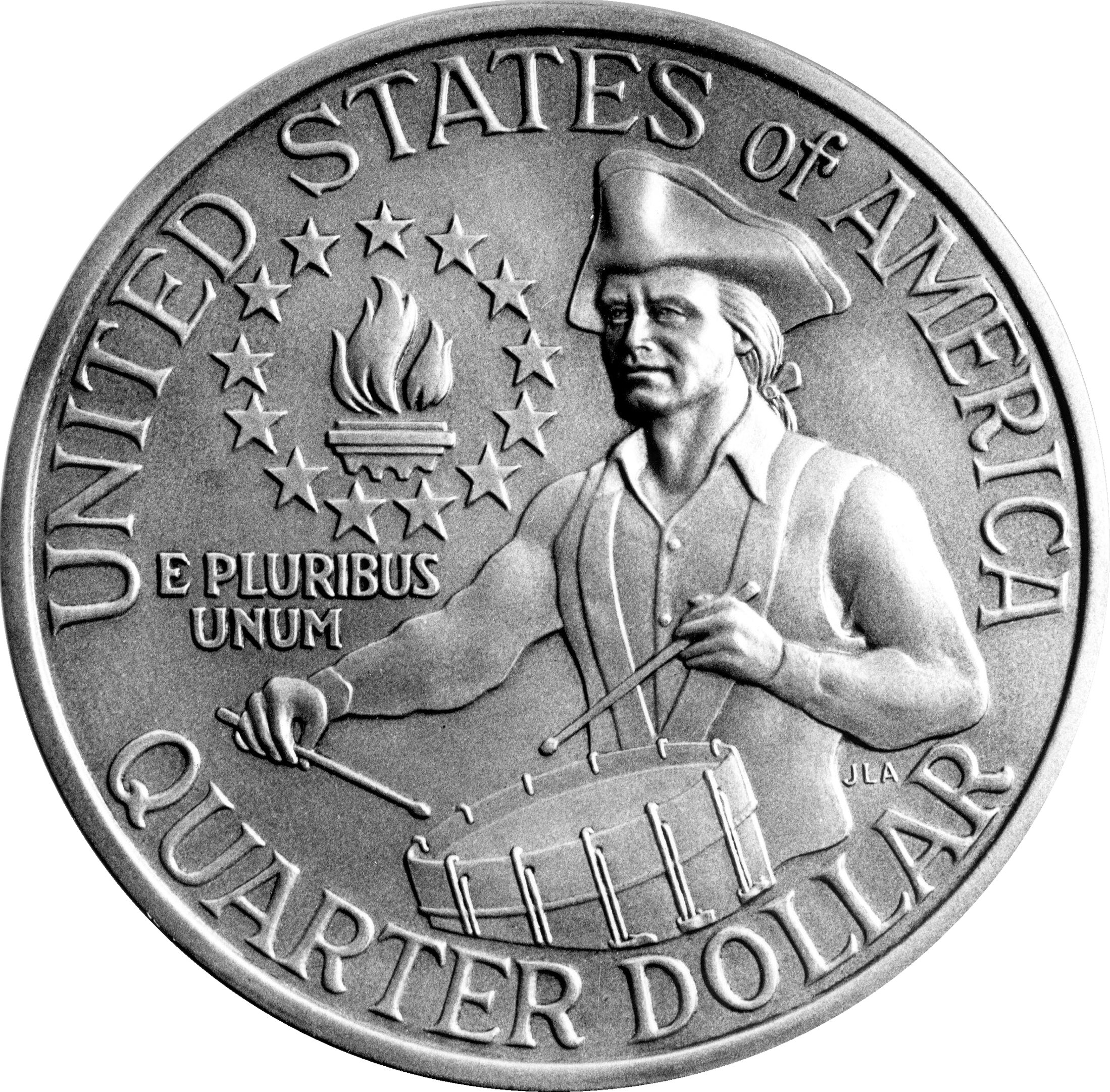
Reverse of the 1776–1976 Bicentennial Washington quarter, featuring Jack L. Ahr's Colonial drummer design. Pittman advocated for the quarter's inclusion in the Bicentennial coinage program.

As ANA president, Pittman advocated for broader changes to U.S. coinage as part of preparations for the United States Bicentennial. Testifying before a congressional subcommittee in 1973, he supported changes to circulating U.S. coins and argued specifically that the reverse of the Washington quarter should be redesigned for the Bicentennial. The subcommittee, citing Pittman's plea for inclusion of the quarter, subsequently urged the Treasury to study the feasibility of adding it to the Bicentennial coinage program. The quarter was subsequently added to the legislation authorizing the Bicentennial coinage.

==== Other ANA service ====
Pittman served in numerous other ANA positions and committees. A 1989 campaign biography described him as having served on more than 55 ANA committees and chaired more than 40 of them. He was particularly active in the association's financial and gifts-and-bequests activities.

=== Other numismatic organizations ===
Beyond his work with the ANA, Pittman held leadership positions in several other numismatic organizations, including the Royal Canadian Numismatic Association (RCNA), the Middle Atlantic Numismatic Association (MANA), the Empire State Numismatic Association, and the International Association of Professional Numismatists (IAPN).

Pittman was also active in the Rochester Numismatic Association (RNA), serving as its president for the 1949–1950 fiscal year. Following his death in 1996, the RNA renamed its library the John Jay Pittman Memorial Library and issued a memorial medal to commemorate its rededication.

He also served as president of the RCNA and as honorary president of the Mexican Numismatic Society. In the interview with Lisot, he recalled that he had once been president of the ANA, the RCNA, and the Mexican Numismatic Society—the only person ever to hold all three positions at the same time.

=== Assay Commission ===
In 1947, Pittman was appointed to the United States Assay Commission. According to a family biography written by his daughter, he took the appointment seriously and asked to remain after the commission's work to review records of the United States Mint.

=== Awards and honors ===
Pittman received the ANA Medal of Merit in 1962 and the Farran Zerbe Memorial Award in 1980. The Farran Zerbe Award, the ANA's highest honor, recognized Pittman's longstanding service to the association and the hobby.

The RNA named him Numismatist of the Year for 1991–1992.

He was inducted into the American Numismatic Association's Numismatic Hall of Fame in 1992. The Hall of Fame, established in 1964 to honor important figures in numismatics, is located at the ANA headquarters in Colorado Springs, Colorado, where plaques commemorate the honorees.

In 1995, Pittman was named a Numismatic News Numismatic Ambassador.

== Personal life ==
Pittman met Gehring Cooper while both were working at Kodak in Rochester. They married in 1937 and remained together for nearly six decades. They had three children, Jay, Polly, and Betsy. According to their daughter Polly Edwards Pittman, Gehring was an important participant in Pittman's numismatic activities, accompanying him on trips and assisting with correspondence and other aspects of his collecting.

The couple traveled extensively, combining family vacations with visits to coin conventions, mints, historical sites, and other destinations. Pittman regarded travel as an educational experience and encouraged his children to pursue education and travel as well.

Pittman was an avid reader with interests extending well beyond numismatics. His family described a large personal library containing books on history, politics, geography, science, languages, and other subjects. He read every issue of National Geographic and was particularly interested in maps and world history.

His interest in history was closely connected to his interest in coins. He regarded coins as tangible links to the people, political events, and cultures that produced them.

Pittman died in Rochester, New York, on February 17, 1996, at the age of 82.

== The John Jay Pittman Collection ==
Following Pittman's death, his collection was cataloged and sold by David W. Akers in three major auctions between 1997 and 1999. The sales were conducted in three parts and included thousands of lots of United States and world coins, paper money, medals, and tokens.

The collection attracted considerable attention because of its breadth, quality, and the unusual circumstances under which it had been assembled. Akers emphasized that Pittman had built the collection himself, one coin at a time, using extensive numismatic knowledge and limited financial resources rather than substantial inherited wealth.

The collection's pedigrees were documented extensively in the auction catalogs. Akers noted that Pittman's records, coin envelopes, ledgers, invoices, and earlier auction catalogs made it possible to reconstruct much of the history of individual pieces.

The three sales became important records of Pittman's collecting career as well as major events in the numismatic auction market of the late 1990s.

== Legacy ==
Pittman is remembered both for the collection he assembled and for his extensive involvement in the American Numismatic Association and the broader coin-collecting community. His career combined collecting, exhibiting, education, organizational leadership, and international participation in numismatics.

Contemporary and later accounts particularly emphasize Pittman's knowledge of coins, extraordinary memory, enthusiasm for displaying and discussing his collection, and willingness to share his knowledge with other collectors.

David W. Akers, who knew Pittman professionally and later cataloged his collection, regarded him as one of the most accomplished figures in twentieth-century American numismatics. Akers wrote that Pittman's identity as a collector was inseparable from his identity as a person, describing the collection as an expression of the history, knowledge, and relationships that had shaped Pittman's life.

== See also ==
- List of coin collectors
