= Chicago Coin Club =

US non-profit organization

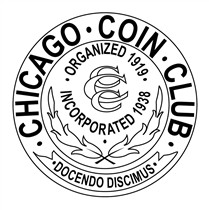
- Seal
- Abbreviation: CCC
- Predecessor: Chicago Numismatic Society
- Formation: 1919
- Founded at: Union League Club of Chicago
- Type: Numismatic
- Location: 321 S. Plymouth Court
- Website: www.chicagocoinclub.org

The Chicago Coin Club or CCC is a numismatic non-profit organization based in Chicago, Illinois. It is the direct successor of the Chicago Numismatic Society.

== History ==
The club began as six men in 1903 who met for dinner in the Union League Club of Chicago who wanted to form a local numismatic group. From 1903-1918 the group would be known as the Chicago Numismatic Society. These early gatherings made popular by events surrounding the Dexter specimen arriving in Chicago, an example of the incredibly rare 1804 dollar. The CNS became A.N.A. Branch No. 1 in 1912, making it the association's oldest club member. In the early years meetings were held at the Masonic Temple Building. The first official meeting of the Chicago Coin Club was called to order on February 14, 1919, with fifteen people in attendance. Up until 1930, the site of the club was the Sherman House Hotel before being moved to the Hotel Atlantic a few months later. Both buildings were demolished by 1980. On January 19, 1938, the Chicago Coin Club was incorporated as a non-profit organization. By February, 1939 the club's current seal was created which lists the Latin motto "docendo discimus or "by teaching, we learn".

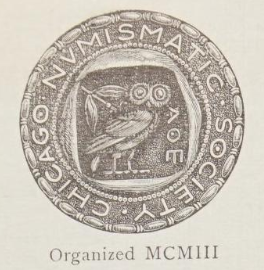
Chicago Numismatic Society logo c. 1905, picturing an Ancient Greek tetradrachm with the Owl of Athena.

The early Chicago Numismatic Society is accredited with "discovering" the immensely rare 1913 Liberty Head nickel for the first time, of which only five are known to exist. The finest of which, known as the Eliasberg specimen (graded PR-66), sold for $5 million in 2007. A man named Samuel W. Brown who attended a meeting on December 3, 1919, is said to have brought a specimen in.

At a meeting in 1938 an all encompassing numismatic society in the Midwest was proposed. Which triggered the formation of another organization on April 23, 1939, known as the Central States Numismatic Society.

The 50th anniversary of the club was held on January 8, 1969 where the sculptor Trygve Rovelstad was asked to create a corresponding medal for the occasion. The final product depicted Arethusa facing left with an eagle-headed helmet with the motto "I WILL." The reverse was made up of the CCC's logo within the six Winter Hexagon stars alongside Betelgeuse. In 1994 to honor the 75th anniversary of the club, the CCC released The Discoverers medal. One piece in gold, 36 in silver, and 165 in bronze were produced in total. The design was directly inspired from James Earle Fraser's sculpture located on the north eastern tender house of the DuSable Bridge.

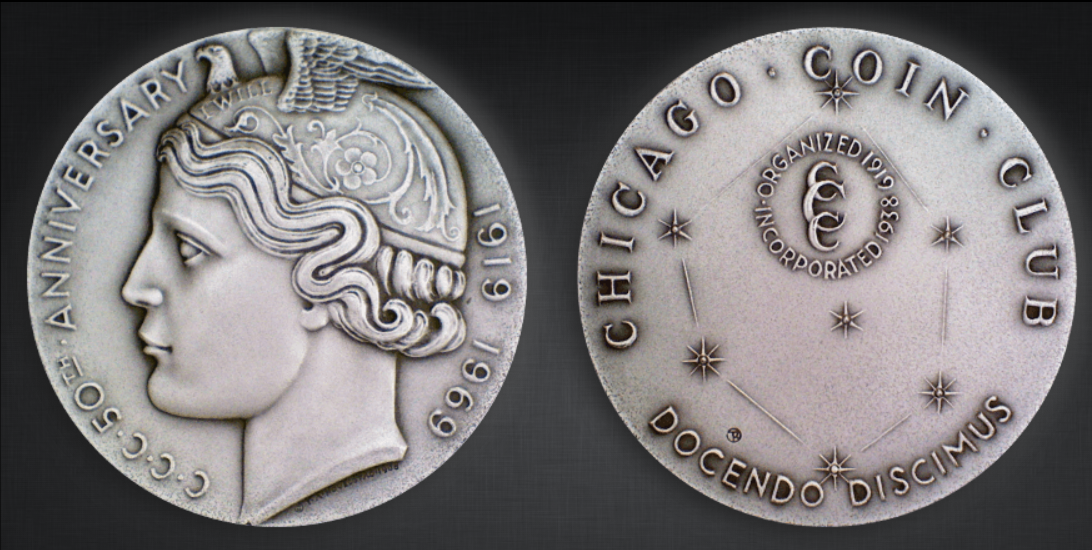
50th Anniversary Medal

In the modern day, the club meets at the Chicago Bar Association building located at 321 S. Plymouth Court in the Loop on the second Wednesday of every month. The club releases a monthly newsletter called the Chatter. The CCC is a member of American Numismatic Association, the Central States Numismatic Society, and the Illinois Numismatic Association. In 2019 the club celebrated its 100th anniversary. During the 1200th CCC meeting, a "2.25 x 3.5 inch brass plaque" (medal) was given to attendees that features the Buckingham Fountain and Chicago Water Tower.

== Notable members ==
- Albert F. Madlener (1868―1947) Charter member No. 23
- Aleksandras Račkus (1893―1965) Charter member No. 16
- B. Max Mehl (1884―1957) Charter member No. 32
- Clifford Mishler (1939― ) ANA president 2009–2011
- Edgar Adams (1868―1940) Editor of The Numismatist 1912–1915
- Halloween Martin (1900―1971) Club banquet entertainer in the 1940's
- Oscar H. Dodson (1905―1996) ANA president 1957–1961
- Richard McPherren Cabeen (1887―1969) Leading philatelist, basis of the CCC's Richard McP. Cabeen Award since 1985
- Richard S. Yeoman (1904―1988) Regular speaker for the CCC, major contributor to Perspectives in Numismatics: Studies Presented to the Chicago Coin Club in 1986. Original author of what would later be known as the numismatic "Red Book" and "Blue Book".
