= Kenneth L. Hallenbeck =

American numismatist

- Hallenbeck at the 2025 ANA World’s Fair of Money
- Born: October 20, 1931 (age 94); Ann Arbor, Michigan, U.S.
- Occupation: Numismatist
- Years active: 1949-present (collecting); 1971-present (business)

Kenneth Luster Hallenbeck, Jr. (born October 20, 1931) is an author and numismatist. He served as president of the American Numismatic Association. He has served with the ANA for 58 years.

== Early life ==
Hallenbeck founded the Ann Arbour Coin Club while in high school. He joined the American Numismatic Association in 1949 when he turned 18 (the youngest age accepted for membership at the time). He served in the United States Army from 1955-56 as a chaplain's assistant, and became involved in the Central California Coin Club in Monterey, California as secretary/treasurer before returning to Ann Arbor.

Hallenbeck worked for Lincoln National Life Insurance Company in Fort Wayne, Indiana, from 1957 to 1977.

== Numismatic Career ==
He was first elected to the American Numismatic Association Board of Governors in 1971 and served for six years. His next position with the ANA was in service to the Money Museum. From 1977 to 1983, he would be the curator before being laid off. On two separate occasions, he was elected to the organization’s policy making board. Hallenbeck served as ANA President from 1989-91. His tenure on the Board of Governors came prior to the 10-year limitation currently in force; he has a total of 16 years of service on the Board.

Hallenbeck served on the U.S. Assay Commission in 1974, where he weighed and handled the 1974 aluminum cents.

In 1983, Hallenbeck opened his own coin shop called The Hallenbeck Coin Gallery in Colorado Springs. His son, Tom took over the enterprise in 2001. Ken and Tom Hallenbeck are the only father and son to serve as Board members of the ANA. Tom served from 1997 to 2001.

Hallenbeck was the Acting Executive Director of the American Numismatic Association from August 2007 until the hiring of Larry Sheppard in July 2008. He helped to stabilize and boost the morale of the Association's employees after the firing of Christopher Chipoletti.

Hallenbeck is considered to be an authority on counter-stamped coins, which are coins that have been stamped by an entity outside of the Mint, usually a business such as a doctor, pharmacist or silversmith. He has written articles on counter-stamped coins for The Numismatist, Coin World, Numismatic Scrapbook Magazine and others. In 2017, he co-authored Forgotten Colorado Silver: Joseph Lesher's Defiant Coins.

At the 2020 National Money Show, his collection of "odd and curious money" was auctioned off.

== Awards and honors ==
In recognition of his service and dedication to numismatics, he has received various honors from the ANA. He is the recipient of the Glenn Smedley Memorial Award (1991), the Medal of Merit (1996), the Exemplary Service Award (1998), and the 1999 Farran Zerbe Memorial Award for distinguished service. In 1993, he was named a Numismatic News Numismatic ambassador. In 2008, he was awarded the ANA Lifetime Achievement Award.

In 2025, Hallenbeck was inducted into the ANA's Numismatic Hall of Fame.

== Personal life ==
Hallenbeck married June Eugenia Miekka in 1955, and they have four children, including Tom Hallenbeck, who is a coin dealer and fellow recipient of the Chester L. Krause Memorial Distinguished Service Award.

Currently, he is a resident of Colorado Springs, Colorado.
