= ILNA (disambiguation) =

ILNA may refer to:

- Illinois Numismatic Association, a numismatic state organization located in Illinois
- Iranian Labour News Agency, an Iranian news agency
