= Alphonse A. Kolb =

American sculptor

- Born: October 5, 1893; Heidelberg, Germany
- Died: March 30, 1983 (aged 89)
- Known for: Sculpture, Engraving

Alphonse Anton Kolb (1893–1983) was a German-American artist known for creating sculptures and other art works ranging in size from medals to statues. For many years he worked for Bastian Brothers of Rochester, New York, and was the semi-official sculptor of the Rochester Numismatic Association.

== Biography ==
Born near Heidelberg, Germany on December 5, 1893. Kolb studied art and sculpture in Munich, Germany and immigrated to the United States in 1913. He became a US citizen in 1918. He was a sculptor, designer, and engraver and worked for Bastian Brothers Company striking metal dies for medals, plaques, and buttons for nearly 50 years. Kolb worked in clay, bronze, steel, wood, silver, and gold, and his works ranged in size from dime-size coins to plaques several feet high. His many works include designing and sculpting the medal for Rochester's centennial in 1934, the medal commemorating the 1,000th meeting of the Rochester Numismatic Association, the medal marking the association's 50th anniversary in 1962, the Bausch & Lomb 75th anniversary, and many others. He was also responsible for a 1928 tablet on the Broad Street side of City Hall honoring pioneers who came to this area on packet boats. Kolb is credited with a 1932 plaque on the west side of Wilson Boulevard at the University of Rochester in Rochester, New York, bearing the words of The Genesee, the song honoring the Genesee River, written by Thomas Thackeray Swinburne, a UR graduate. In 1938, Kolb designed and sculpted the Civic Medal which is awarded annually by the Rochester Museum and Science Center for community service. In 1955, Kolb was himself the recipient of this award.

At the age of 65, he decided to retire. He and his second wife, Kathryn, traveled for a time, but after her death in 1968, he decided to return to work. "I can’t be without my work," Kolb said. "It’s the best thing for me." Kolb was also a coin and medal collector and had a rose garden at his home. He was a lifetime member American Numismatic Association, the Rochester Numismatic Association, and the Albany Numismatic Society. As a member of the Rochester Numismatic Association, Kolb designed and struck dies for the medal awarded to the outgoing president of the organization bearing that person's likeness. Kolb held this responsibility from 1920 to 1976, and was himself president of the organization in 1931.

Alphonse Kolb was married to Elfrieda L. Reichelt Kolb until her death in 1945. He later remarried, this time to Kathryn M. Yohann Kolb. Alphonse Kolb did not have any children by either of his marriages, though he was survived by nieces and nephews in Germany. Kolb suffered a cerebral hemorrhage and died on March 30, 1983, at the age of 89.
