= Scott A. Travers =

American numismatist

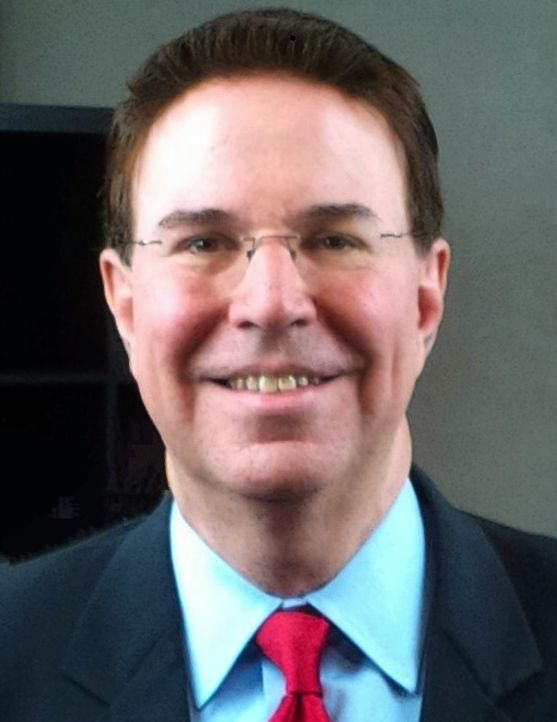
- Born: November 12, 1961 (age 64); New York City
- Education: Brandeis University
- Occupations: Numismatist, author
- Writing career
- Genres: Non-fiction, reference work
- Subjects: Coin collecting, numismatics, history of coins
- Website: usgoldexpert.com

Scott A. Travers (born November 12, 1961) is an American numismatist and author. Travers is considered to be a prominent consumer advocate for coin collectors, informing the public about common and potential scams.

== Career ==
Travers has authored seven books on the subject of coin collecting. He has been an Editor of COINage magazine since 1984. From 1997 to 1999, Travers served as Vice President of the American Numismatic Association. His expertise has been cited by such news publications as The Wall Street Journal, the Los Angeles Times, CNBC, and others.

Travers was also a coin valuation consultant for the Federal Trade Commission. He is President of Scott Travers Rare Coin Galleries, LLC, in New York City.

== Personal life ==
Travers grew up in New York City, and attended the Dwight School on Manhattan's Upper West Side during grade school when he first began buying and selling coins. Travers earned a Bachelor of Arts degree from Brandeis University in 1983.

== Awards ==
- 2003 Presidential Award, American Numismatic Association
- 2010 Numismatic Ambassador Award, Numismatic News
- 2016 Burnett Anderson Memorial Award for Excellence in Numismatic Writing, American Numismatic Association.
- 2017 Century Club Award, American Numismatic Association

== Books ==
- Travers' Rare Coin Investment Strategy, Second Edition (Prentice Hall Press, 1989)
- The Investor's Guide to Coin Trading (John Wiley & Sons, Inc., 1990)
- How to Make Money in Coins Right Now, Second Edition (House of Collectibles, 2001)
- One-Minute Coin Expert, Sixth Edition (House of Collectibles, 2007)
- Scott Travers' Top 88 Coins to Buy & Sell, Second Edition (House of Collectibles, 2007)
- The Coin Collector's Survival Manual, Seventh Edition (House of Collectibles, 2010)
- The Insider's Guide to U.S. Coin Values, 21st Edition (House of Collectibles, 2015)

== External ==
- Official website
