= A. G. Heaton =

American painter, author and numismatist

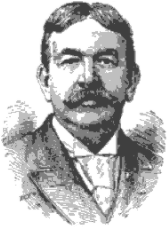
- Born: Augustus George Heaton; April 28, 1844; Philadelphia, Pennsylvania, U.S.
- Died: October 11, 1930 (aged 86); Washington, D.C., U.S.
- Resting place: Laurel Hill Cemetery, Philadelphia, Pennsylvania. U.S.
- Education: Pennsylvania Academy of Fine Arts; École des Beaux-Arts
- Occupations: Artist, writer, numismatist
- Spouse: Adelaide Griswold (m. 1874; div. 1898)
- Children: 3

Augustus Goodyear Heaton (April 28, 1844 – October 11, 1930) was an American artist, author and leading numismatist. He is best known for his painting The Recall of Columbus and among coin collectors for writing A Treatise on Coinage of the United States Branch Mints, which introduced numismatists to mint marks.

== Early life, family, and education ==
Augustus Goodyear Heaton was born as Augustus George Heaton in Philadelphia on April 28, 1844, to Rosabella (née Crean) and Augustus Heaton.

Heaton was a student at the Pennsylvania Academy of the Fine Arts with Peter F. Rothermel; and he was the first American student at the École des Beaux-Arts in Paris, studying with Alexandre Cabenel, and Leon Bonnat.

Heaton lived in various locations: New York City in the late 1870s; Paris, France in the early 1880s; Philadelphia (1884); Washington, D.C. (1885); and then West Palm Beach, Florida. In 1890, 1892 and 1930, he was in New Orleans where he gave art lectures and painted portraits of numerous prominent citizens.

Heaton married Adelaide Griswold in New York City on December 24, 1874, and had three children; Augustus (1875), Henry (1877) and Perry (1884), before divorcing in 1898.

== Career ==
=== Artwork ===
Heaton worked as a teacher in Philadelphia at the Art Students' League of Philadelphia.

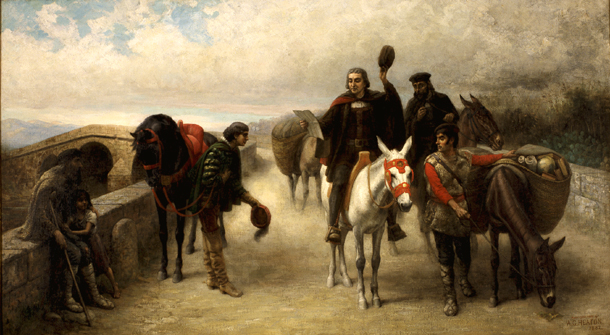
The Recall of Columbus

Most of Heaton's paintings are portraits, including Varina Davis, second wife of President Jefferson Davis, known as First Lady of the Confederate States of America (1892), Sculptor Chauncey Ives (1883), Opera singer Emma Nevada and Bishop Thomas Bowman of Cornell College, Iowa. (1883). His most famous painting, however, and the one of which he was most proud, was The Recall of Columbus, painted in 1882 and copyrighted in 1891 as the 400th anniversary of Christopher Columbus' landing approached. It was begun in his Paris studio and finished in Rome in the studio of American sculptor Chauncey Ives. The painting was sent to the U.S. Capitol in 1884 to be reviewed by the Joint Committee on the Library, purchased later that year for $3,000 and remains part of the United States Senate Art and History Collection. In 1892, the painting was exhibited at the Columbian Historical Exposition in Madrid in 1892 and again in 1893 at the World's Columbian Exposition in Chicago. Also in 1893, to mark the Chicago Exposition, was the release of the Columbian Issue, a set of 16 commemorative stamps issued by the United States. The 50 cent stamp featured The Recall of Columbus bringing the painting to the attention of the general public.

Heaton was one of the founding members of the New Rochelle Art Association, organized in 1912, and part of the well known Art Colony that had developed in New Rochelle in the early 1900s.

Other works of note are The First Mission of Washington (1862), Columbia's Night Watch (1866), Bathing Hour at Trouville (1880) and The Promoters of the New Congressional Library (1888), which is a life sized group portrait composed of eighteen prominent statesmen. His Hardships of Emigration was also placed on a stamp for the Omaha Fair in 1898.

=== Numismatics ===
Heaton was the third president of the American Numismatic Association, governing from 1894 to 1899. In 1893, he published his famous Treatise on Coinage of the United States Branch Mints, which revolutionized numismatics. Until its publication, collectors generally only collected by date. Heaton's Treatise, commonly referred to as just Mint Marks, showed that the coinage of the branch mints was often significantly more scarce and hence worth far more. In 1900, Heaton updated Mint Marks in the article, Late Coinage of the United States Mint, published in The Numismatist. Heaton was a frequent contributor to The Numismatist, submitting both articles and poetry, including The Numismatist and the Burglar, published by The Numismatist in 1894 and later appeared in Heaton's book, Fancies and Thoughts in Verse. As a collector, he owned a complete collection of US $3 and $1 gold coins from all five mints where they were coined, one of only two such collections in existence.

== Death ==
He died of heart disease at Sibley Hospital in Washington, D.C., on October 11, 1930, and was interred at Laurel Hill Cemetery in Philadelphia.

== Publications and articles ==
- 1882 – Memories of Italy
- 1893 – A Treatise on Coinage of the United States Branch Mints
- 1895 – A Tour Among the Coin Dealers, appeared in The Numismatist
- 1900 – The Heart of David, The Psalmist King
- 1903 – Poems by John Henry Boner (Illustrations by Heaton)
- 1903 – Stolen From a Duchy's Throne by Leland Dolph Cox (Illustrations by Heaton)
- 1904 – Fancies and Thoughts in Verse
- 1906 – Yellowstone Letters
- 1915 – Study Rewarded
- 1925 – The Nutshell
- 1926 – The Marseillaise
- 1929 – Color; a Treatise: A Treatise
