= George P. French =

American numismatist

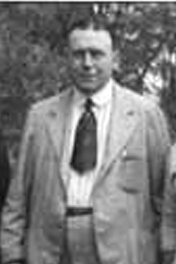
George P. French in 1913

George P. French was a founding member and first president of the Rochester Numismatic Association. He was born in 1865 and died November 25, 1932, in Rochester, New York of pneumonia.

French graduated from Columbia Medical College in 1888, interned at St. Mary's Hospital, and went into private practice. He was a founding member of the Rochester Numismatic Association and its first president. The association issued a medal celebrating its first anniversary. This medal also honored French with his portrait on its obverse.

An avid numismatist, French was best known to the numismatic community for his collection of large cents formed by him over a period of forty years. This collection included practically all the known die varieties of large cents and consisted of 832 pieces, nearly every one of which was in uncirculated condition. He had exhibited this collection at several American Numismatic Association conventions, and it was perhaps the foremost of its kind formed at the time. Three of the 1793 cents were valued at $5,000 each (equivalent to $94,000 in 2025). French's obituary in The Numismatist reported at the time that this collection of large cents had been sold around 1929 to B. Max Mehl, of Fort Worth, Texas, for around $50,000.00 (equivalent to $938,000 in 2025).

== RNA Presidential Medal ==
A medal commemorating the founding of the Rochester Numismatic Association (RNA) and its first president, Dr. George P. French. The medal includes a portrait of Dr. French and was created by Joseph A. Koeb, an employee of Bastian Brothers Company of Rochester and a charter member of the RNA as well as the club's first member-sculptor. A copy of the medal was handed out to each of the 32 charter members at the 1st RNA Anniversary Banquet. Much later, some restrikes were made by pairing the original obverse die with an updated reverse die.
