= Walter Breen =

American numismatist, writer and convicted sex offender (1928–1993)

- Born: September 5, 1928; San Antonio, Texas, U.S.
- Died: April 27, 1993 (aged 64); Chino, California, U.S.
- Education: Georgetown University
- Alma mater: Johns Hopkins University (BA)
- Occupations: Numismatist; writer
- Spouse: Marion Zimmer Bradley (m. 1964; div. 1990)
- Children: 2
- Writing career
- Pen name: Walter of Greenwalls
- Genres: Fantasy, science fiction, science fantasy, historical fantasy

Walter Henry Breen Jr. (September 5, 1928 – April 27, 1993) was an American numismatist, writer, and convicted child sex offender. He was known among coin collectors for writing Walter Breen's Complete Encyclopedia of U.S. and Colonial Coins; "Breen numbers", from his encyclopedia, are widely used to attribute varieties of coins. He was also known for activity in the science fiction fan community and for his writings in defense of pederasty as a NAMBLA activist. He was arrested in 1990 for child sex abuse and died in prison three years later.

From 1964 to 1990 Breen was married to popular science fiction and fantasy author Marion Zimmer Bradley; it was later revealed that Bradley had been aware of his crimes.

== Early life ==
Breen was born in San Antonio, Texas, the son of Walter Henry Breen Sr. and Mary Helena (Nellie) Brown Mehl. He spent the first several years of his life in Texas with his parents.

At the time they met, both of Walter's parents were married to other people and living next door to each other in Parkersburg, West Virginia. Walter's father changed his own name from Walter H. Green to Breen after abandoning his wife and children to run away with Walter's mother. Later in life, Breen sometimes denied they were his birth parents and claimed to have been adopted by them as a foundling child. In reminiscences he spoke of being raised in a variety of "institutional and foster settings."

The 1940 census shows young Breen living in a Catholic orphanage in West Virginia, with his (by then) divorced mother living as a housekeeper in a Catholic church rectory less than two miles (3 km) away. Walter's father was by that time living with another woman in Chicago; for a while after their separation his mother resumed her maiden name and young Walter went by the name William Brown.

Breen attended a Catholic high school in Wheeling, West Virginia. After being declared unfit for service by the United States Army Air Forces in April 1946, Breen was accepted that October with a recorded IQ of 144. Breen was enlisted for three years.

According to Breen, shortly after being enlisted he was severely beaten and then honorably discharged. During his recovery, he said that he had read voluminously about rare coins and initiated correspondence with various members of the numismatics community. Alternatively, Breen claimed that a severe head injury suffered in a World War II plane crash led to the development of his photographic memory.

He received his Bachelor of Arts in mathematics from Johns Hopkins University in 1952. He later claimed he finished four years of coursework in approximately ten months, concealing the fact that as a high-IQ teenage prodigy he had already completed two years at Georgetown University during World War II, followed by a brief stint at a small Catholic college in Texas. After graduating Phi Beta Kappa, he took a position as an auction cataloger for the New Netherland Coin Company while concurrently enrolled in pre-med courses at Columbia University, where he became a protege of the controversial psychologist and numismatist William Herbert Sheldon.

Breen had a longtime interest in studying high-IQ youth, which included taking out advertisements in the early 1960s for a projected private school for gifted children which Breen hoped to launch in New York City, a project which came to nothing in the end. William Sheldon worked closely with Breen on a number of coin-related projects in the 1950s, including the book Penny Whimsy, and although Sheldon encouraged Breen to attend medical school, he eventually distanced himself from the scientist, allegedly, per Breen in an interview, in part due to Sheldon's professed anti-Semitism.

Breen eventually enrolled in the sociology graduate program at the University of California, Berkeley, where he claimed to have researched "the Beat Generation groups on both coasts but also some of the very earliest hippies, finding out incidentally that some ideas that the bunch of us had developed in science fiction fandom had gotten into the hippie subculture and were being paraded around as their own inventions." He received his M.A. in the sociology of music from the institution in 1966.

== Writings ==
=== Numismatics ===
In March 1951, the journal The Numismatist published his earliest numismatics writings, including How Our Coinage Became Mechanized. Two years later he completed his first book on American coins, Proof Coins Struck by the United States Mint, 1817–1901. From 1962 to 1965, he wrote a column called "Bristles and Barbs" for Coin World. Throughout the 1950s and 1960s, he had several feature articles published in The Coin Collectors Journal and Numismatic Scrapbook Magazine.

He wrote Dies & Coinage in 1962.

In 1977, he released Walter Breen's Encyclopedia of United States and Colonial Proof Coins: 1722-1977.

Breen was listed as a collaborator on William Herbert Sheldon's seminal work on early date large cents, Penny Whimsy (1958), which was his revision of 1949's Early American Cents.

Breen co-wrote The Encyclopedia of United States Silver & Gold Commemorative Coins 1892 to 1954 with Anthony Swiatek in 1981.

In 1983, he released Walter Breen's Encyclopedia of United States Half Cents 1793-1857.

Breen began working on his Complete Encyclopedia of United States Coins around 1976, and after 12 years it was released. The book was lauded by The Numismatist as "the Super Red Book...not likely to be exceeded in scope or depth."

In 1998, Bruce A. Vogel edited and published Walter Breen's Numisma: The United States Cent 1816–1857.

In 2000, Mark Borckardt edited an 800-plus page reference work of Breen's large cent research, Walter Breen's Encyclopedia of Early US Cents 1793-1814 published by Bowers & Marena.

In 2022, Dwight N. Manley donated a collection of Breen's books from Sydney F. Martin to the American Numismatic Association Library in Colorado Springs.

=== Other writings ===
Breen also spent considerable time compiling information on the history of homosexuality and pederasty. His research, unprecedented in its extensive treatment of the history but not adhering to the standards of scholarly research, formed the basis for his 1964 book Greek Love, which he published under the pseudonym "J.Z. Eglinton". Breen collaborated with Warren Johansson in researching the book. He dedicated the book to his wife, Marion Zimmer Bradley (unnamed in the dedication), who edited it. He also published a journal, The International Journal of Greek Love, under the same pseudonym. As "Eglinton" Breen made an appearance and spoke at the founding convention of NAMBLA in 1978.

His other interests included dirty limericks and fortune cookies. He self-published monographs on both subjects.

== Arrests and convictions ==
Breen was initially convicted of child molestation or lewd behavior in Atlantic City in 1954, resulting in a probationary sentence. In 1963–1964, allegations of further sex crimes caused within science fiction fandom a controversy known as "Breendoggle"; Breen was banned from attending Pacificon II and briefly blackballed from the subculture's main amateur press association. Nevertheless, prominent fans of the era (such as John Boardman and Ted White) dismissed the allegations as hearsay and "character assassination," and the scandal blew over. Shortly thereafter, Breen married Bradley, who was aware of his behavior but chose not to report him. A further molestation conviction may have occurred in 1964.

Breen was again arrested on child molestation charges in 1990. He accepted a plea bargain, which resulted in three years' probation.

A year later, he was charged with eight felony counts of child molestation involving a 13-year-old boy. Though diagnosed with liver cancer in 1992, he was sentenced to 10 years in prison. The conviction resulted in his expulsion from the ANA. He died in prison in Chino, California, on April 27, 1993.

In 2014, Breen's daughter Moira Greyland revealed that she was one of the people who reported her father for child molestation.

== Personal life ==
In addition to his employment with First Coinvestors, Inc., where he was an officer for many years, Breen was an active member of the science fiction fan community for much of his life. He wrote for fanzines, and took over editorship of the fanzine Fanac from Terry Carr and Ron Ellik.

He married science fiction writer Marion Zimmer Bradley on June 3, 1964, her 34th birthday. Together, they founded the Kingdom of the East of the Society for Creative Anachronism in 1968. They had two children and separated in 1979. After their separation, Breen moved to Oakland, California. Bradley remained his principal employer. They officially divorced on May 9, 1990.

He regularly wore his Phi Beta Kappa key as a zipper pull on the fly of his pants. He joined Mensa in 1958 or 1959, possibly the first American to do so.

A user of marijuana and LSD, Breen believed in reincarnation, often recounting putative past lives in Atlantis, ancient Greece, and other mythological and historical epochs.

== Selected publications ==
- Walter Breen's Complete Encyclopedia of U.S. and Colonial Coins New York: Doubleday, 1988.
- Walter Breen's Encyclopedia of United States Half Cents 1793–1857 South Gate: American Institute of Numismatic Research, 1983.
- California Pioneer Fractional Gold: Historic gold rush small change 1852–1856 and suppressed jewelers' issues 1859–1882 (with Ronald Gillio) Santa Barbara: Pacific Coast Auction Galleries, 1983.
- The Encyclopedia of United States Silver & Gold Commemorative Coins 1892 to 1954 (with Anthony Swiatek) New York: Arco Pub./F.C.I. Press, 1981.
- The Darkover Concordance: A Reader's Guide Berkeley: Pennyfarthing Press, 1979.
- Walter Breen's Encyclopedia of United States and Colonial Proof Coins, 1722- 1977 New York: Arco Pub./F.C.I. Press, 1977.
- The Gemini Problem: A Study in Darkover (chapbook) Baltimore: T.K. Graphics, 1975.
- The Minting Process: How Coins are Made and Mismade Los Angeles: American Institute of Professional Numismatists, 1970.
- Greek Love (as J.Z. Eglinton, with Warren Johansson) New York: Oliver Layton Press, 1964.
- Dies & Coinage New York: QWERTYUIOPress, 1962.
- Penny Whimsy: A Revision of Early American Cents 1793-1814, An Exercise in Descriptive Classification with Tables of Rarity and Value (with William Herbert Sheldon and Dorothy I. Paschal) New York: Durst Publications, 1958.
- Lusty Limericks & Bawdy Ballads (monograph self-published in 1956)
