= George French =

George French may refer to:

- George French (judge) (1817–1881), Chief Justice of Sierra Leone and the British Supreme Court for China and Japan
- George French (Scottish footballer) (fl. 1919–????), Scottish footballer with Morton
- George French (footballer, born 1926) (1926–2012), English footballer
- George A. French (New York politician) (1798–1865), New York politician
- George A. French (Minnesota politician) (1901–1992), American lawyer and politician who served in the Minnesota House of Representatives
- George Arthur French (1841–1921), first Commissioner of the North-West Mounted Police
- George B. French (1883–1961), American film actor
- George P. French (1865–1932), founding member and first president of the Rochester Numismatic Association
- George Russell French (1803–1881), British antiquary
- George T. French Jr. (fl. 2000s–2020s), American academic
- George W. French (1823–1887), associate justice of the South Dakota Supreme Court
