= Thomas Thackeray Swinburne =

American poet

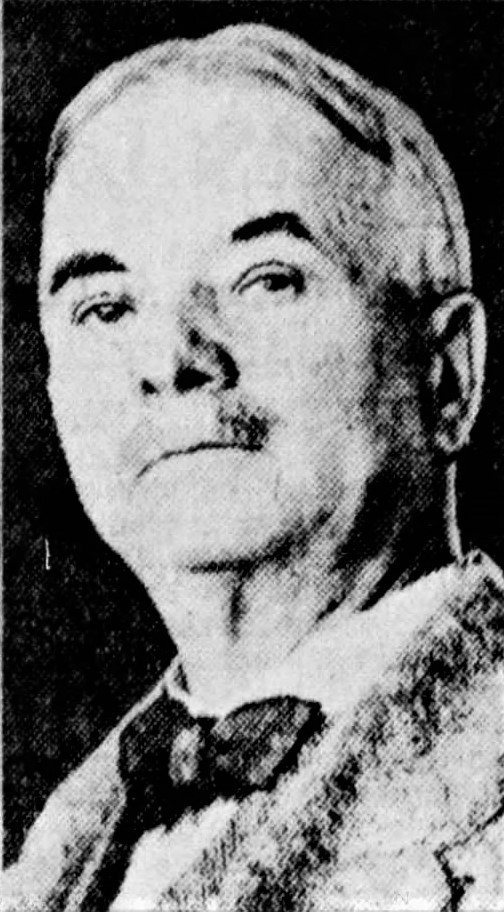
Thomas Thackeray Swinburne

Thomas Thackeray Swinburne (April 21, 1865 – December 17, 1926) was an American poet from Rochester, New York. He has been called "Rochester's poet laureate" He wrote a number of books of verse which he printed himself; one of these—By the Genesee: Rhymes and Verses—contains a version of the poem which, set to music by Herve D. Wilkins, has become the alma mater of the University of Rochester – The Genesee.

Swinburne attended the University of Rochester as a member of the class of 1892, but never graduated. He was a member of Theta Delta Chi fraternity.

One critic compared Swinburne and Rochester in Song and Verse to Edgar Lee Masters and his Spoon River Anthology.

In December 1926, distraught over the death of his sister Rose, to whom he had dedicated By the Genesee and Rochester in Song and Verse, he committed suicide by jumping from a bridge into the Genesee River. A body was found in June 1927 at Forest Lawn, on the shore of Lake Ontario in Webster, New York was identified as Swinburne's by his clothing, however, later some doubt was cast on the identification.

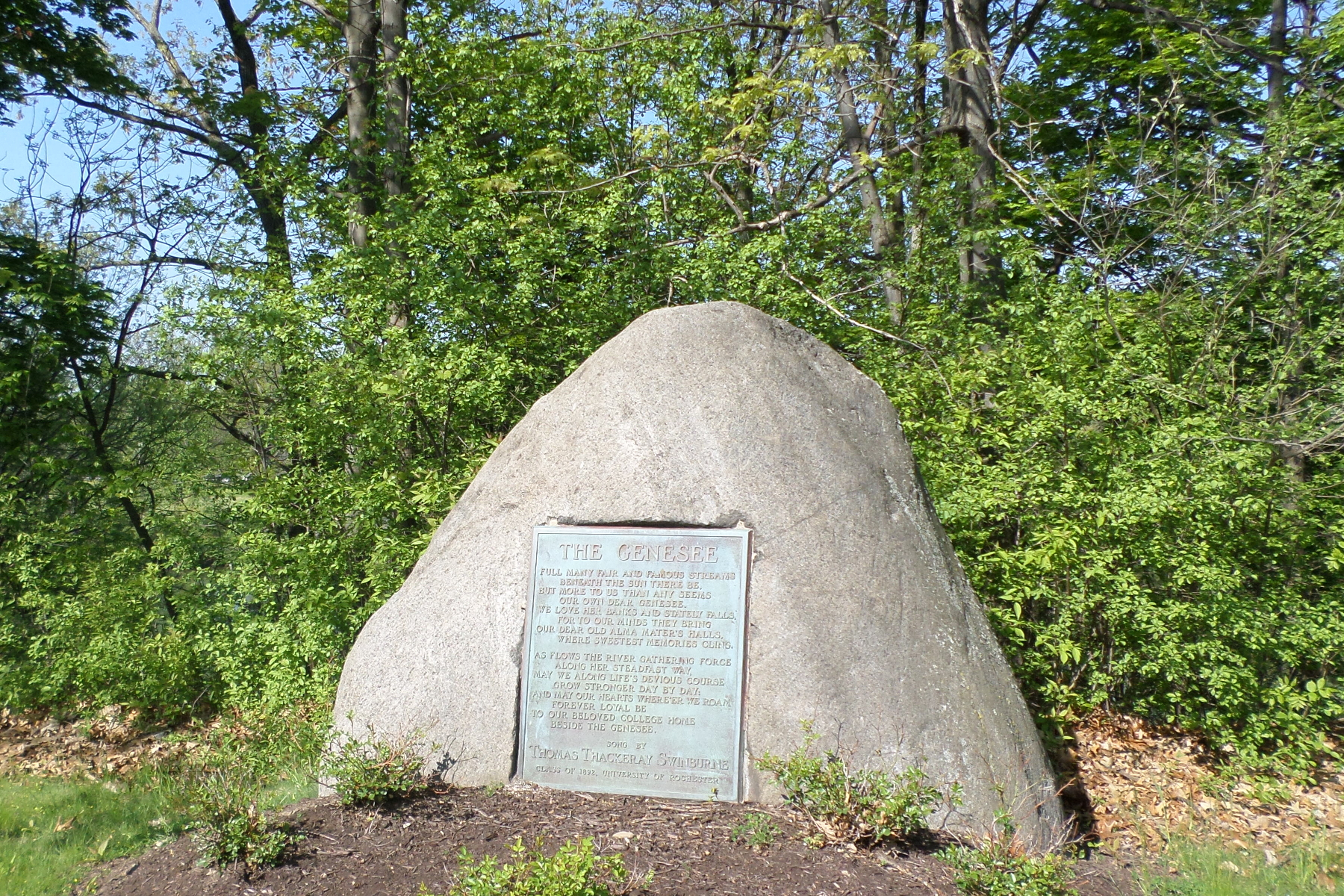
"Swinburne Rock" - memorial to Thomas Thackeray Swinburne

The University of Rochester and the Rochester community honored Swinburne with a memorial, Swinburne Rock, placed "beside the Genesee" near the university's Interfaith Chapel. The memorial, proposed in 1927 and dedicated in 1933, is a 26-ton glacial boulder holding a bronze plaque with verses from The Genesee sculpted by Alphonse A. Kolb. According to local legend Swinburne's ashes were interred under the rock, but when it was moved in 1968 no remains were found. News reports, however, indicate that the poet's ashes were scattered on the Genesee River in July, following his death.

== Books ==
- By the Genesee: Rhymes and Verses (1900)
- St. Peter's Chimes & Bells of St. Peter (1902)
- Rochester Rhymes (1907)
- The Steingod: A Tale of Halloween (1908)
- Sonnets of Sonnenberg (1911)
- Rochester in Song and Verse, with Other Rhymes (1924)
- The Cosmies: A Little Science for Little People
- Cascónchiagón (one sheet, illustrated by Thomas Davies)
