= Neil Shafer =

American numismatist and author

- Born: April 24, 1933; Chicago, Illinois, U.S.
- Died: August 26, 2023 (aged 90); Fox Point, Wisconsin, U.S
- Occupations: Numismatist, author
- Years active: 1962–2023

Neil J. Shafer (April 24, 1933 – August 26, 2023) was an American numismatist and author, specializing in paper money and Philippine numismatics.

== Early life ==
Originally a coin collector, Shafer's interest in paper money began in 1945, when he was given a confederate note in Chicago. He graduated from Roosevelt High School in Chicago and attended Arizona State College, graduating in 1955.

== Career ==
Shafer began his writing career in 1962, working for Western Publishing Company, Inc. as numismatic editor from 1962 to 1975, and senior editor from 1976 to 1981, when he was hired by Krause Publications, working there from 1981 to 1985.

He edited the Middle Atlantic Numismatic Association Journal in 1957, and was associate editor of the Whitman Numismatic Journal from 1964 to 1968.

In 1965, he wrote A Guide Book of Modern United States Currency, which was printed in eight editions through 1979. He wrote Let's Collect Paper Money in 1976. In 1986, he was appointed editor-in-chief of the short-lived New England Journal of Numismatics.

Along with R. A. Mitchell, he co-wrote the Standard Catalog of Depression Scrip of the United States in 1984, and wrote Banknotes, Scrip and Paper Ephemera of Milwaukee in 1990.

In 2013, Shafer wrote Panic Scrip of 1893, 1907 and 1914 – An Illustrated Catalog of Emergency Monetary Issues.

Shafer has written several columns in numismatic publications during his career, including the "Paper Money News and Views" column for Bank Note Reporter, and "Paper Views" in Numismatic News. He wrote a monthly article in Bank Note Reporter starting in 1987. He taught the American Numismatic Association's Summer Seminar for many years.

=== Philippine Numismatics ===
Within the numismatic community, he was considered one of the foremost authorities on Philippine numismatics, including money produced for the islands under United States authority. He authored several books on the subject, including United States Territorial Coinage For the Philippine Islands (1961), A Guide Book of Philippine Money (1964), and Philippine Emergency and Guerrilla Currency of World War II (1974). Shafer also collected and researched Manila's Santo Tomas Internment Camp meal chits, early U.S. Army Camp Exchange tokens and other similar items in paper. In a nod to Russell Rulau, who first coined the term "exonumia" for tokens and medals in 1960, Shafer coined the term "exographica" to refer to these items.

== Awards and honors ==
Shafer was a life member of the Milwaukee Numismatic Society, and is the namesake of the organization's Distinguished Service Award.

Shafer has been awarded the American Numismatic Association’s Medal of Merit (1990), was named Adult Advisor of the Year (1993), received a Presidential Award (1996), and the Lifetime Achievement Award (2007). Other awards he has won are the Numismatic Literary Guild's Clemmy Award (2004), and the Central States Numismatic Society Elston G. Bradfield Writer’s Award (1989). He was inducted into the American Numismatic Association Hall of Fame in 2008, and received the organization's highest honor, the Chester L. Krause Memorial Distinguished Service Award in 2014.

In 2018, he was inducted into the Society of Paper Money Collectors Hall of Fame.

Following his death, the MPC Fest, an organization dedicated to Military Payment Certificate collecting, established the "Neil Shafer Military Numismatics National Champion Award", presented to the winner of their trivia contest.

== Personal life ==
Shafer served in the United States Air Force from 1955 to 1959, playing in the Air Force Band during that time. He served as assistant conductor of the Racine Symphony Orchestra from 1963 to 1972.

He married Edith Oelsner in 1964 and they had three children.

Shafer died on August 25, 2023 and is buried in Second Home Cemetery in Greenfield, Wisconsin.
