= Bill Fivaz =

American numismatist and author

- Born: February 26, 1934 (age 92); Fulton, New York, U.S.
- Occupations: Numismatist, author
- Years active: 1950-present
- Notable work: The Cherrypickers' Guide to Rare Die Varieties

William Frederic "Bill" Fivaz Jr. (born February 26, 1934) is an American numismatist and author.

== Early life ==
Fivaz attended Hamilton College in Clinton, New York, graduating in 1956. Following graduation, he served in the United States Navy.

== Career ==
Fivaz has written over a dozen books focused on numismatics/coin collecting, and is best known as the co-author of The Cherrypickers' Guide to Rare Die Varieties, first published in 1990 and subsequently re-issued seven times.

In 1999, Fivaz released Helpful Hints For Enjoying Coin Collecting. At the American Numismatic Association's 2003 World's Fair of Money in Baltimore, Fivaz's collection, including Buffalo nickels, Mercury dimes, silver dollars, errors, and counter-stamped coins, was sold at auction.

In 2005, he wrote United States Gold Counterfeit Detection Guide, published by Whitman Publishing, to aid collectors in distinguishing between real and fake gold coins. He was a member of the Citizens Coinage Advisory Committee from 2004-08.

In November 2020, Fivaz's "World's Worst Type Set", featuring coins graded "Poor-1" and "Fair-2", was auctioned by Stack's Bowers Galleries. In June 2022, Fivaz was part of a team of five numismatists who re-classified the 1943 over 42 Lincoln cent as an overdate variety, in addition to its previously known doubled die status.

In addition to his numismatic work, Fivaz was a regional sales manager for Nestle out of its Atlanta offices from 1959 to 1996.

== Awards and honors ==
He was named 2001 "Numismatist of the Year" by the American Numismatic Association, and served as an association governor from 1985 to 1989. Fivaz is the recipient of the ANA's highest honor, the Farran Zerbe Memorial Award (1995), is a two-time Medal of Merit honoree (1984 and 1989), and a two-time M. Vernon Sheldon Memorial Audio/Visual Award recipient. In 1981 he was named ANA Outstanding Adult Advisor. He was inducted into the Association's Numismatic Hall of Fame in 2002.

In 2021, Fivaz was named one of Coin World's Most Influential People in Numismatics (1960–2020).

In 2010, the American Numismatic Association named one of their Young Numismatist Literary Awards after Fivaz, where articles submitted by children ages 8–12 can win awards and numismatic books.

In 2026, Fivaz was named the recipient of the ANA's Lifetime Achievement Award.

== Personal life ==
Fivaz married Marilyn (1933–2025) on July 14, 1956, and they had two children, Bill and Diane.
