= Virginia Irwin =

American journalist (1908–1980)

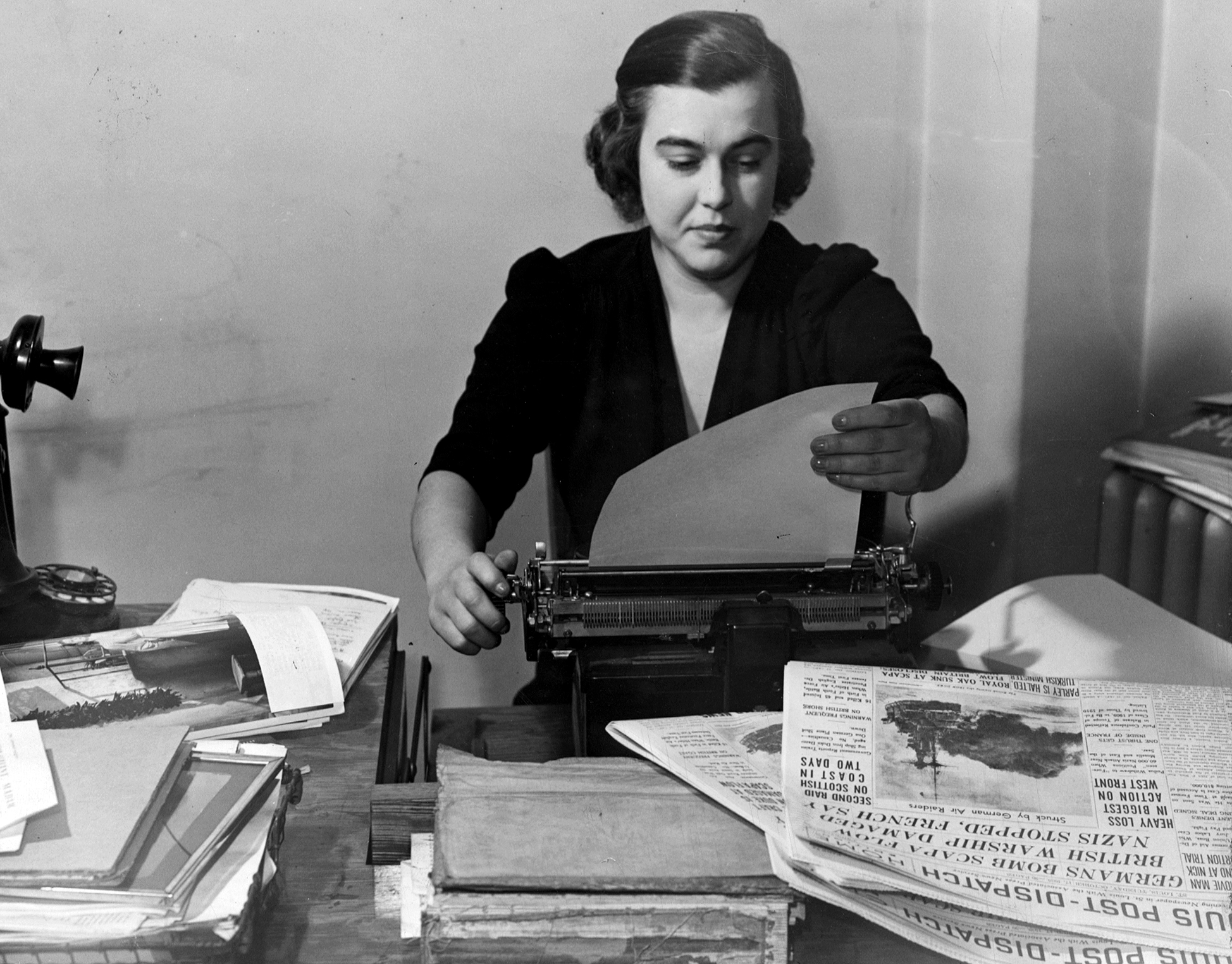
- Born: June 29, 1908; Quincy, Illinois
- Died: August 19, 1980 (aged 72)

Virginia Irwin (1908–1980) was an American Second World War war correspondent who worked for Joseph Pulitzer. A photo of her with the headline "She Got to Berlin" featured in the St. Louis Post-Dispatch on VE Day, 1945.

Irwin was born in Quincy, Illinois, where she became valedictorian of her high school and attended Lindenwood College and Gem City Business College. Her first job was a secretarial position in a paper factory owned by her uncle, where she met a salesman whom she briefly married 1930–1932. After her divorce she moved to Saint Louis where she worked at the St. Louis Post-Dispatch reference desk. She started writing for the cooking column and was hired by the editor of the Everyday Magazine in 1934. She was assigned "the woman's angle" and wrote on "childcare, etiquette, marriage, divorce, and household problems". Her pieces often provoked letters to the editor, and her work was read by women and men alike. After Pearl Harbor her work took on a more serious tone and she wrote a series on women working in the Women's Auxiliary Army Corps.

Irwin finished an eleven-part series on women in war industries in 1943. For this she had traveled across the western United States and this inspired efforts to obtain accreditation to report on events in Europe as a war correspondent. Her superiors (OK Bovard and Ben Reese) refused to agree to sponsor a woman abroad, but they agreed on a leave of absence for a year and she left for England, where she worked in the public relations department of the American Red Cross. She was encouraged to send in articles, which she did until finally earning accreditation from Washington D.C. through approval from Joseph Pulitzer and formal application by Washington correspondent Raymond P. Brandt. Her early contributions described the preparations of American soldiers in England preparing for Operation Overlord, always being careful to include stories of local men wherever possible. A month after D-Day she finally left for the continent and joined the American troops and accompanied them to France. In September 1944 she became the first woman correspondent of the 19th Air Command. She followed the Third Army through the winter and spring, and on April 25, 1945, she was covering the fall of Nuremberg when she met Boston reporter Andrew Tully who had a driver and asked her if she wanted to go see the fall of Berlin. They crossed the Elbe at Torgau and managed to make it to Berlin, but due to censorship the dateline of her April 27 filed story was finally published on May 8 front page.

After the war she took on a position as New York correspondent for the Post-Dispatch, returning to Saint Louis in 1960. Despite the more cosmopolitan locale, even in New York City she was often assigned the "woman's angle" again, making advice column contributions under the pseudonym 'Martha Carr', work she disliked.
