= J. Hewitt Judd =

American ophthalmologist and numismatist

- Born: John Hewitt Judd; May 12, 1899; Dawson, Nebraska, U.S.
- Died: December 20, 1986 (aged 87); Omaha, Nebraska, U.S.
- Occupations: Numismatist, author
- Years active: 1930–1986
- Notable work: United States Pattern, Experimental and Trial Pieces

John Hewitt Judd (12 May 1899 – 20 December 1986) was an American ophthalmologist and numismatist.

== Early life ==
He was born in Dawson, Nebraska, studied at the University of Nebraska, and was professor of ophthalmology there from 1930 to 1964.

== Career ==
Judd is best known for his work on United States pattern coins, writing the definitive work, United States Pattern, Experimental, and Trial Pieces. Judd served as president of the American Numismatic Association from 1953 to 1955, and was awarded the Farran Zerbe Memorial Award in 1955. He also served on the 1965 Assay Commission.

== Personal life ==
Judd married Ellanore Baxter in 1935.
