= Illinois Numismatic Association =

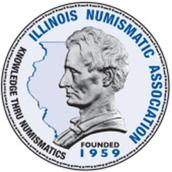
- Seal
- Abbreviation: ILNA
- Formation: 1959
- Founder: Peoria Coin Club
- Founded at: Peoria Marriott Pere Marquette
- Type: Numismatic
- Members: 374
- Website: ilnaclub.org

The Illinois Numismatic Association or ILNA is a numismatic state organization located in the U.S. state of Illinois since 1959. Despite having no permanent headquarters, the main mailing address is located in Arlington Heights.

== History ==
The formation of the association first came to be during a meeting at the Peoria Coin Club Show in the Hotel Marriott Pere Marquette in September, 1959. The association has a total of 28 local club members (lists 23) from across Illinois as of November, 2025. Prior shows have been held in Peoria, Chicago, Centralia, Mattoon, Springfield, LaSalle, Joliet, Moline, and Tinley Park.

The ILNA Coin Digest is published by the association four times a year. All four 1998 digests were entered into a national competition for numismatic publications hosted by the American Numismatic Association. On April 14, 1999 it was announced that the ILNA placed 2nd. That same year the ILNA website was chosen to be the site for the official unveiling of the Susan B. Anthony dollar.

The ILNA shows were regularly held at the Tinley Park Convention Center in Tinley Park since the early 2000s, along with the Greater Chicago Coin & Currency Show. In September 17–19, 2009, the ILNA celebrated their 50th anniversary. That same year the United States Mint began minting the Lincoln Bicentennial cents, so in response the event was largely Abraham Lincoln themed. The convention hosted 220 dealer tables and 1,687 attendees. With even Tinley Park's then mayor Ed Zabrocki and a Lincoln impersonator cutting the ceremonial ribbon.

The most recent ILNA show occurred in September, 2026 at the Countryside Banquets & Conference Center in Countryside.

== ILNA Club Members ==
Club Name	Location
Central Illinois Numismatic Association	Springfield
Champaign-Urbana Coin and Currency Club	Urbana
Chicago Coin Club	Chicago
Corn Belt Coin Club	Normal
Dixon Coin Club	Dixon
Dupo Coin Club	Dupo
Elgin Coin Club	Elgin
Fairfield Coin Club	Fairfield
Hillsboro Hiltop Coin Club	Hillsboro
Hillside Coin Club	Hillside
Indian Hill Coin Club	Round Lake Park
Lake County Coin Club	Gurnee
Mattoon Coin Club	Mattoon
McHenry County Coin Club	Crystal Lake
Mid-State Coin and Antique Club	Clinton
Mundelein Coin Club	Mundelein
Oak Forest Numismatic Society	Tinley Park
Quad-City Coin Club	Moline
Railsplitter Coin Club	Lincoln
Rockford Area Coin Club	Machesney Park
Tazewell Numismatic Society	Pekin
Western Illinois Coin Club	Galesburg
Will County Coin Club	Plainfield
