= Herve D. Wilkins =

American organist and composer

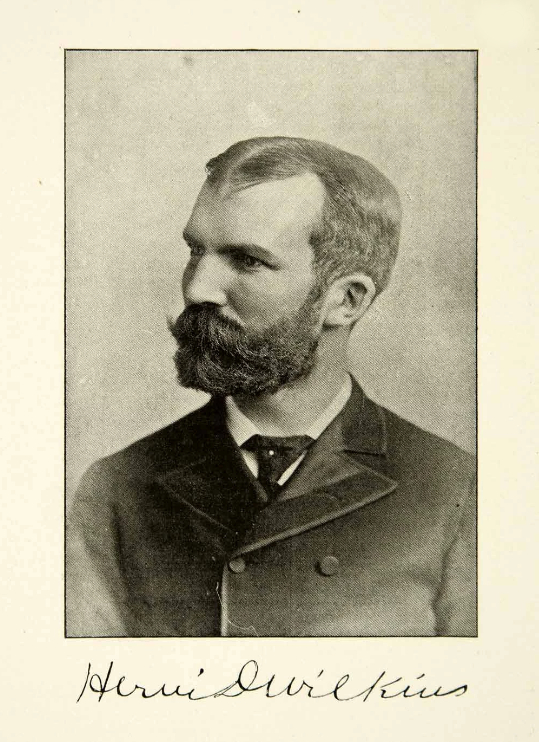
Herve D. Wilkins around 1900

Herve Dwight Wilkins (8 August 1843 – 24 November 1913), was an American organist and composer.

== Education ==
He attended the University of Rochester, where he was a member of Psi Upsilon fraternity and Phi Beta Kappa. He graduated in 1866 and became a church organist and music teacher. He received a Master of Arts degree from the university in 1870. From 1870 to 1873 he studied piano, singing, organ, and composition in Berlin, Germany.

== Musical career ==
As a child, Wilkins began singing in the church choir at the age of six. In 1865 he gave an organ recital at the Plymouth Congregational Church in Rochester (later the Plymouth Spiritualist Church), and continued to give recitals for many years at Saint Peter's Church, First Presbyterian Church, and Brick Church. He also gave numerous piano recitals. In 1892 he estimated that he had given 140 organ and piano recitals. In 1880 he was a founder of the Mendelsohn Vocal Society in Rochester. He served as organist at several churches in the Western New York area. In 1896 he was a founder of the American Guild of Organists. He was a solo organist at the Centennial Exposition in Philadelphia in 1876, the Pan-American Exposition in Buffalo in 1900, and the Louisiana Purchase Exposition in Saint Louis in 1904. He composed "several works for organ, twelve sacred quartetts[sic] for male voices, the Theta Delta Chi song book, and some detached songs." he is noted for setting to music, adapted from the tune of an old sea chanty The Pilot, the poem "The Genesee" by Thomas Thackeray Swinburne which became the alma mater of the University of Rochester, and for "Auld Lang Syne Concert Paraphrase."

He served as president of the New York State Music Teachers' Association, was a founder of the American Guild of Organists, and was director of the Batavia Philharmonic Orchestra and the Mendelssohn Vocal Society.

== Personal ==
Wilkins was born in Italy, New York in 1843, the son of a clergyman. In 1870 he married Julia E. Smith (1838–1921), daughter of former Rochester mayor Elijah F. Smith. The couple had four children. Wilkins died in 1913.
