= Gem City Business College =

Coordinates: 39.9331918°N 91.4047141°W

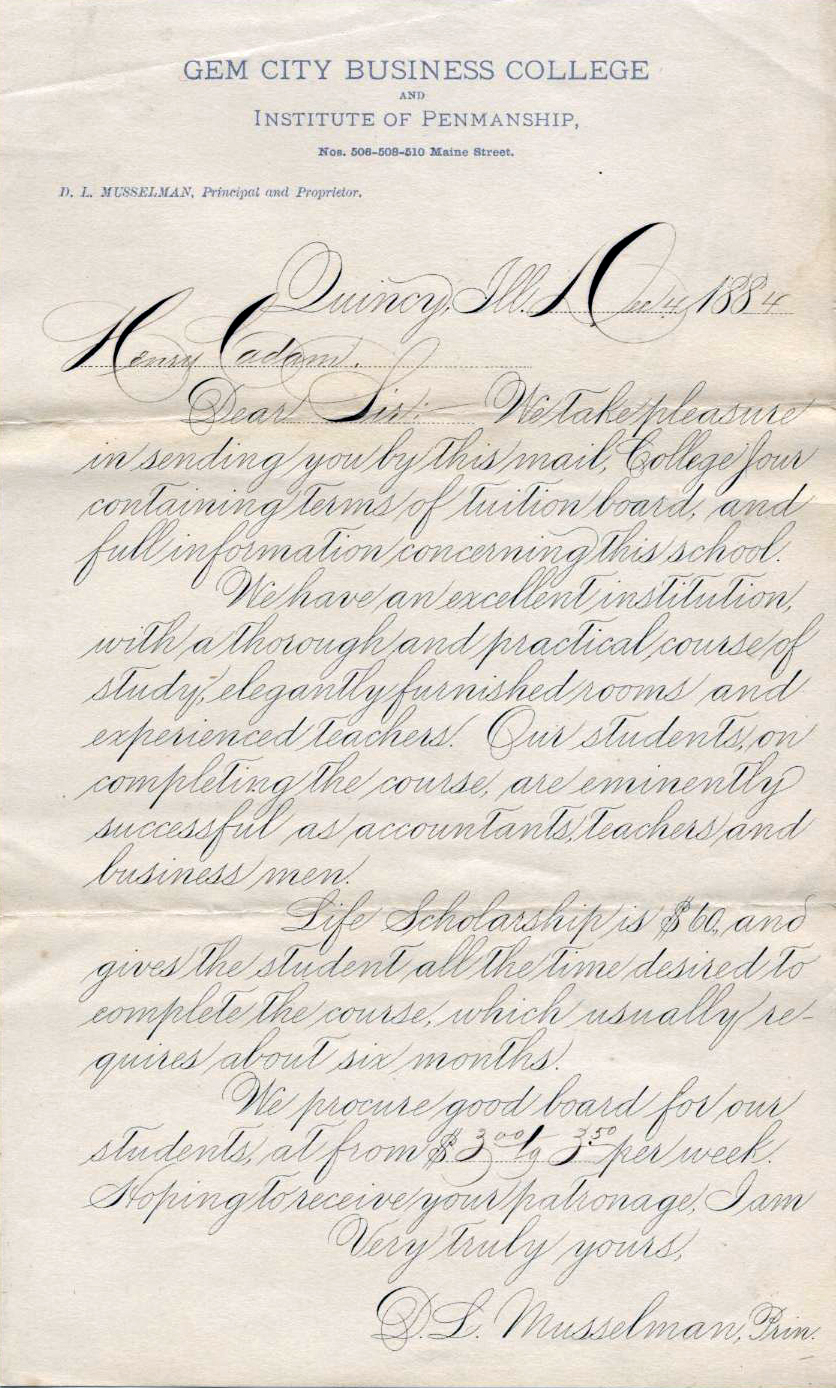
Letter from college president D. L. Musselman in Spencerian script

Gem City Business College was a business school in Quincy, Illinois. It was founded by DeLafayette Musselman in 1870.

The Musselman Building was part of the school. The five-story building opened in 1892.

Robert O. Brown wrote a history of the college published by Northeast Missouri State Teachers College in 1958.

== Alumni ==
- D. W. Bell
- Professor F. E. Wolf of Baker University
- Mable Mathews
- Virginia Irwin
- William H. Wheat
- Lloyd Morey
- Robert L. Hendershott
- Robert M. Danford

== See also ==
- Chaddock College
- South Side German Historic District
