= Docendo discimus =

Latin proverb

Docendo discimus is a Latin proverb meaning "by teaching, we learn."

It is perhaps derived from Seneca the Younger (c. 4 BC – 65 AD), who says in his Letters to Lucilius (Book I, letter 7, section 8): Homines dum docent discunt., meaning "People learn while they teach."

== Motto ==
Docendo discimus is the motto of the following institutions:

- U.S. Army Command and General Staff College, Fort Leavenworth, Kansas
- Boss Clinical Education (BossCE), Kuala Lumpur, Malaysia
- 911 Tactical Academy, Hollywood, Florida
- Smolensk State Medical University, Smolensk, Russian federation (СГМУ)
- Pacific National University, Khabarovsk, Russian Federation
- University of Defense in Czech Republic
- Medisch- Natuurphilosophisch en Veterinair- Tandheelkundig Gezelschap “Christiaan Huygens”, Utrechtsch Studenten Corps, The Netherlands
- Cherepovets State University in Cherepovets, Russia
- Azerbaijan University of Languages in Baku, Azerbaijan
- Stranmillis University College in Belfast, Northern Ireland
- the University of Chichester in West Sussex, England
- Central Washington University in Ellensburg, Washington
- Johnson State College in Johnson, Vermont
- Gillingham School in Dorset, England
- Novosibirsk State Technical University in Novosibirsk, Russia
- Oles Honchar Dnipro National University in Ukraine
- Federal College of Education Yola, Adamawa State, Nigeria.
- The Alexandru Ioan Cuza National College, Ploieşti, Romania
- Bulgarian Diplomatic Institute in Sofia, Bulgaria
- Saure AS in Norway
- New York International School
- Regional Cadet Instructor School (Central) - Canadian Forces
- Swedish Air Force Flying School
- Hilford Grammar High School, Sydney
- USAF, Maintenance Management Analysis, 2R0X1
- Newton Bright Educational Consultants, United Kingdom
- University of Chichester, UK
- The George Coșbuc National College, Cluj-Napoca, Romania
- Chicago Coin Club, United States
