= Chester L. Krause Memorial Distinguished Service Award =

Highest honor by the American Numismatic Association

The Chester L. Krause Memorial Distinguished Service Award (formerly the Farran Zerbe Memorial Award and ANA Distinguished Service Award) is the highest honor conferred by the American Numismatic Association. The award was formerly named after Farran Zerbe, a one-time president of the American Numismatic Association. It is given in recognition of numerous years of outstanding, dedicated service to numismatics. The criteria for the nominee should be that the individual is considered someone who has rendered numerous years of outstanding service to the ANA as well as the field of numismatics. An additional qualification is that the nominee should be a former Medal of Merit and Glenn Smedley Memorial Award recipient. The award is limited only to members of the ANA.

In 2021, the ANA Board of Governors voted to change its name to the ANA Distinguished Service Award, following an investigation that uncovered accusations of fraudulent behavior on Zerbe's part. In May 2022, the award was re-named in honor of Chester L. Krause, the founder of Krause Publications.

== Winners ==
=== 1950s ===
- 1951 – M. Vernon Sheldon
- 1952 – June T. Pond
- 1953 – Col. Joseph Moss
- 1954 – Lewis M. Reagan
- 1955 – Dr. J Hewitt Judd
- 1956 – Richard S. Yeoman
- 1957 – No Award Given
- 1958 – Burton H. Saxton
- 1959 – Louis S. Werner

=== 1960s ===
- 1960 – Glenn B. Smedley
- 1961 – Dr. John F. Lhotka, Jr.
- 1962 – Lee F. Hewitt
- 1963 – Elston G. Bradfield
- 1964 – Jack W. Ogilvie
- 1965 – Lionel C. Panosh
- 1966 – J. Douglas Ferguson
- 1967 – Dr. John S. Davenport
- 1968 – Oscar H. Dodson
- 1969 – Eric P. Newman

=== 1970s ===
- 1970 – Charles M. Johnson
- 1971 – Don Sherer
- 1972 – Abe Kosoff
- 1973 – Matt H. Rothert
- 1974 – Herbert Berge
- 1975 – Margo Russell
- 1976 – Fred C. Bowman and Maurice M. Gould
- 1977 – Chester L. Krause
- 1978 – William C. Henderson
- 1979 – John J. Gabarron

=== 1980s ===
- 1980 – John Jay Pittman
- 1981 – Virgil Hancock
- 1982 – George D. Hatie
- 1983 – Clyde Hubbard
- 1984 – Charles L. Krause and Clifford Mishler
- 1985 – Adna G. Wilde, Jr.
- 1986 – Charles H. Wolfe
- 1987 – Virginia Culver and Edward C. Rochette
- 1988 – Adeline and Aubrey E. Bebee
- 1989 – Harry X. Boosel

=== 1990s ===
- 1990 – James L. Miller
- 1991 – Q. David Bowers
- 1992 – Paul R. Whitnah
- 1993 – Robert L. Hendershott
- 1994 – Florence M. Schook
- 1995 – Dorothy C. Baber and Bill Fivaz
- 1996 – Elvira Clain-Stefanelli
- 1997 – Ruthann Brettell
- 1998 – Bert and Kenneth E. Bressett
- 1999 – Kenneth L. Hallenbeck

=== 2000s ===
- 2000 – Arthur M. Kagin
- 2001 – Harry J. Forman
- 2002 – Anthony J. Swiatek
- 2003 – Lighthouse Family and Charles J. Ricard
- 2004 – Gene R. and Patricia Hynds
- 2005 – Joseph E. Boling
- 2006 – Larry J. Gentile, Sr.
- 2007 – Nancy Opitz Wilson and John Wilson
- 2008 – Gene Hessler
- 2009 – John Eshbach

=== 2010s ===
- 2010 – Beth Deisher
- 2011 – Anthony Terranova
- 2012 – Arthur M. Fitts III and Prudence Fitts
- 2013 – David Schenkman
- 2014 – Neil Shafer
- 2015 – Donn Pearlman
- 2016 – Mark Lighterman and Myrna Lighterman
- 2017 – Brian Fanton
- 2018 – Cindy Wibker
- 2019 – Thomas Hallenbeck

=== 2020s ===
- 2020 – Walt Ostromecki
- 2021 – Kerry Wetterstrom
- 2022 - Thomas J. Uram
- 2023 - Mike Fuljenz
- 2024 - Dwight N. Manley
- 2025 - James Halperin
- 2026 - Anthony Terranova
