= The Coin Collector's Survival Manual =

- Language: English
- Genre: Manual
- Published: 1984
- Publisher: Prentice-Hall
- Publication place: United States
- ISBN: 978-0375723391
- Website: usgoldexpert.com/tccsm

The Coin Collector's Survival Manual is a coin collecting and investing reference book authored by Scott A. Travers that was first published by Arco, a Prentice-Hall imprint, in July 1984 simultaneously in hardcover and paper editions. Its then 22-year-old author bluntly detailed the coin industry's perils and pitfalls in buying, selling and storing valuable coins based on his experiences as a dealer. The book has since been updated and published in multiple editions.

In 1988, when its second edition was published by Prentice Hall Trade, a division of Simon & Schuster, it was considered an important part of the coin literature. The third (1994); revised third (1996); fourth (2000); and revised fourth (2003) editions were published by Bonus Books of Chicago.

Beginning with the fifth edition, The Coin Collector's Survival Manual incorporated another book authored by Scott A. Travers, How to Make Money in Coins Right Now, and the combination work was published in 2006 by House of Collectibles, an imprint of Random House. House of Collectibles published the sixth (2008); seventh (2010); and revised seventh (2015) editions.

The Numismatic Literary Guild (NLG) gave The Coin Collector's Survival Manual twelve awards, including "Book of the Year" in 1984 and in 2006 for the fifth edition, where it was tied. The revised seventh edition was named "Best Investment Book" in 2016.

The book has been cited in various news articles as authoritative about evaluating coins.
