= Rochester Numismatic Association =

American non-profit organisation

The Rochester Numismatic Association (RNA) is a not-for-profit organization with an educational mission. The RNA was organized in 1912 by a group of local collectors to attract the American Numismatic Association's annual convention to Rochester, New York, USA. They met with success as the ANA did hold their convention in Rochester. The RNA has met continuously since 1912. Only one local coin club, the Boston Numismatic Society, founded in 1860, has a longer record of continuous meetings.

The RNA is located in Rochester, New York with a very active regional membership. Many members have retained their membership after leaving the area. Now, the RNA boasts a membership that reaches across the continental US.

Each fall the RNA holds a regional coin show at the Rochester Museum and Science Center which attracts dealers and attendees from around Western New York.

== History ==
The RNA was formed in January 1912 by Dr. George P. French with 32 charter members. The first meeting attracted 15 coin collectors. Dr. French collected other curiosities besides coins. His curios included the clothes worn by General Tom Thumb, one of the world's smallest men, and Peter the Great.

One of the first acts of Dr. French was to have the RNA join the American Numismatic Association as Branch 2. The Chicago Numismatic Society had become ANA Branch 1 in 1904.

At the first annual banquet in 1913, a two-inch bronze portrait medal was presented to Dr. French, the retiring president. This tradition has continued to this day. During World War II, plastic impressions were made from the dies and presented at the annual banquet. At the war's end, bronze pieces were struck from the original dies.

Joseph A. Koeb, a charter member of the RNA, was the club's first member-sculptor. An artisan employed by Bastian Brothers Company of Rochester, he hand cut the dies in steel for the American Numismatic Association badge for the convention of 1912, held in Rochester, NY. As official club sculptor, he designed the reverses common to all medals from 1912 to 1952 and all the portraits of past presidents from 1912 to 1921.

In 1921 Alphonse A. Kolb, another member-sculptor, began hand cutting the portrait dies. Alphonse A. Kolb designed many medals for both the ANA and the RNA.

The Rochester Numismatic Association has hosted three ANA Conventions, in 1912 at the Hotel Rochester, in 1917 at the Memorial Art Gallery and in 1928 at the Seneca Hotel. An existing photograph of the 1912 convention shows the 47 people who attended and the number included only two women. Photos of the 1917 Convention show fewer people but many more women present. This is thought to reflect the social aspects of very early coin conventions.

From the beginning the club has maintained both a collection and a circulating library. The curator often brings selections to meetings for display. Especially when the pieces complement the talk given that evening.

In 1947, the RNA sponsored the Rochester Junior Numismatic Association under the leadership of Edward F. Meinhart, the 31st president of the senior group. Since then, the RJNA has met independently on a monthly basis. Many RJNA members continue on to join the RNA. Each spring the RNA sponsors a speaking contest named to honor Edward F. Meinhart. The contest is open to young numismatists and is intended to encourage the study and enjoyment of numismatics. Every participant is given a trophy and the winner is given a plaque.

== Presidential medals ==
Each year the RNA honors the immediate past president with a medal and a banquet. This tradition started with the first RNA president, Dr. George P. French. The early medals were created by RNA members and accomplished artists Joseph A. Koeb and Alphonse Anton Kolb.

== Club memberships ==
The RNA is a member organization of:

- American Numismatic Association (Branch #2, and ANA Life Club #8),
- American Numismatic Society,
- Royal Canadian Numismatic Association,
- Empire State Numismatic Association,
- Token and Medal Society (TAMS),
- Rochester Museum and Science Center (RMSC)

== See also ==
- Exonumia
- Numismatics
- Coin collecting
- Regular issue coinage
- Coin grading
