= Robert L. Hendershott =

American numismatist (1898–2005)

- Born: August 7, 1898; St. Louis, Missouri, U.S.
- Died: March 23, 2005 (aged 106)
- Occupation: Numismatist

Robert Lynn Hendershott (August 7, 1898 – March 23, 2005) was an American numismatist. He was a member of the American Numismatic Association Hall of Fame.

He owned the Mirasol Hotel on Davis Islands (Tampa).

== Early life ==
The son of Chalmers Doran Hendershott and Cordelia Hendershott (born Bartlett), he studied banking at Washington University and the Gem City Business College in Quincy, Illinois. He worked for most of his life in real estate.

== Numismatics ==
Hendershott started collecting coins at age 12, finding half cents, large cents, two-cent pieces, half dimes and other obsolete coinage still in circulation."

He was one of the key organizers of the Tampa Coin Club and Florida United Numismatists, serving as president of both organizations. Hendershott received the American Numismatic Association's Farran Zerbe Memorial Award for Distinguished Service.

=== Books ===
In 1994, he wrote and published a catalog of 1904 World's Fair memorabilia titled "The 1904 St. Louis World's Fair - The Louisiana Purchase Exposition: Mementos and Memorabilia". The book consists of 365 pages and included 67 categories and further classified into 217 sub-categories. Over 2,600 items are listed, each with one or more photos, along with a biography of Robert Hendershott. The Forward and Publisher's Note is written by Kurt Krueger, publisher of a previous book of 1904 World's Fair Exonumia. The Overview is written by Eric Newman, a noted American numismatist. It is cataloged as ASIN B0006F33YY.
