= David Schenkman =

American numismatist (born 1939)

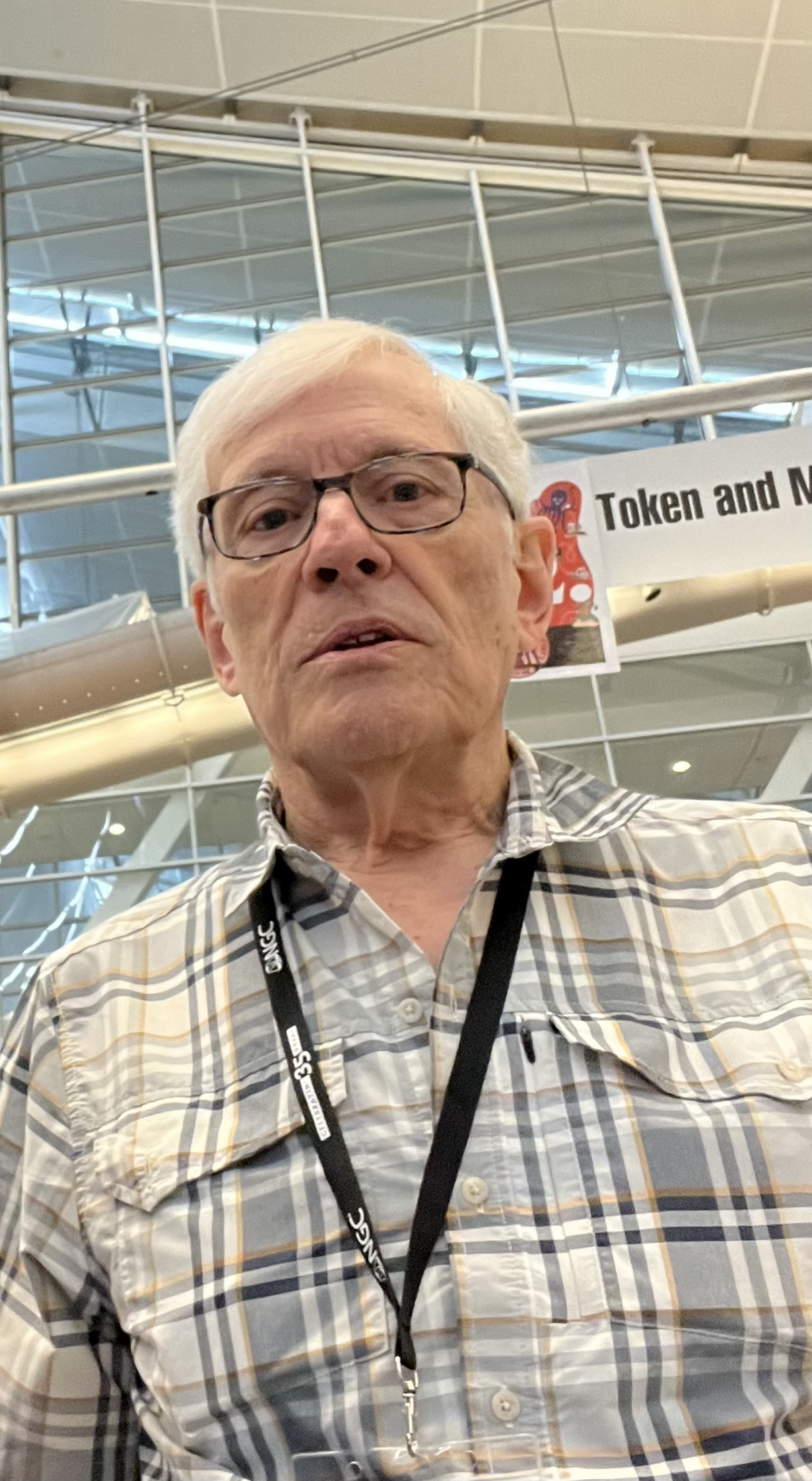
- Schenkman at the 2023 World’s Fair of Money
- Born: September 27, 1939 (age 87); New York, New York, U.S.
- Occupations: Numismatist, author
- Years active: 1949-present (collecting); 1975-present (writing)

David E. Schenkman (born September 27, 1939) is an American numismatist and author, specializing in tokens and medals.

== Early life ==
Schenkman was born in New York City and served in the United States Navy.

== Career ==
Schenkman began collecting coins in 1949 and began his interest in tokens and medals in 1960. He joined the American Numismatic Association in 1962. From 1975 to 1980 he was editor of the Copperhead Courier. Schenkman edited "A Survey of American Trade Tokens" in 1975. He authored “World of Exonumia” in Coin World between 1985 and 1988 and “Token Topics” to Numismatic News. He currently writes the "Tokens and Medals" column for The Numismatist and contributes articles to the Token and Medal Society's TAMS Journal and Civil War Token Society's Civil War Era Numismatics.

Since 2017, he has written a column called “American Token Manufacturers & Their Agents” for the TAMS Journal, which examines the companies that created tokens.

Schenkman has received more than eighty-five literary awards, including nine Heath Literary Awards. Over his career he has written ten books, including Virginia Tokens (1980), which was the first book to catalog trade tokens from the state.

Schenkman served as President of both the Token and Medal Society and the Civil War Token Society, and has spent 18 years as an instructor at the American Numismatic Association's Summer Seminar.

== Awards and honors ==
Schenkman received his first Heath Literary Award in 1994. He received the Glenn Smedley Memorial Award in 2003 and Medal of Merit in 2007, as well as the Lifetime Achievement Award in 2012.

In 2013, Schenkman received the Farran Zerbe Memorial Award from the American Numismatic Association. He has been inducted into the Civil War Token Society Hall of Fame (2004) and the American Numismatic Association Hall of Fame (2015).

In 2025, he received the Burnett Anderson Memorial Award for Excellence in Numismatic Writing.

== Personal life ==
Schenkman is married to Joanne Crowley. His nephew is Eric Schenkmam, guitarist and founding member of the Spin Doctors.
