= Barry Stuppler =

American coin dealer and numismatic association president

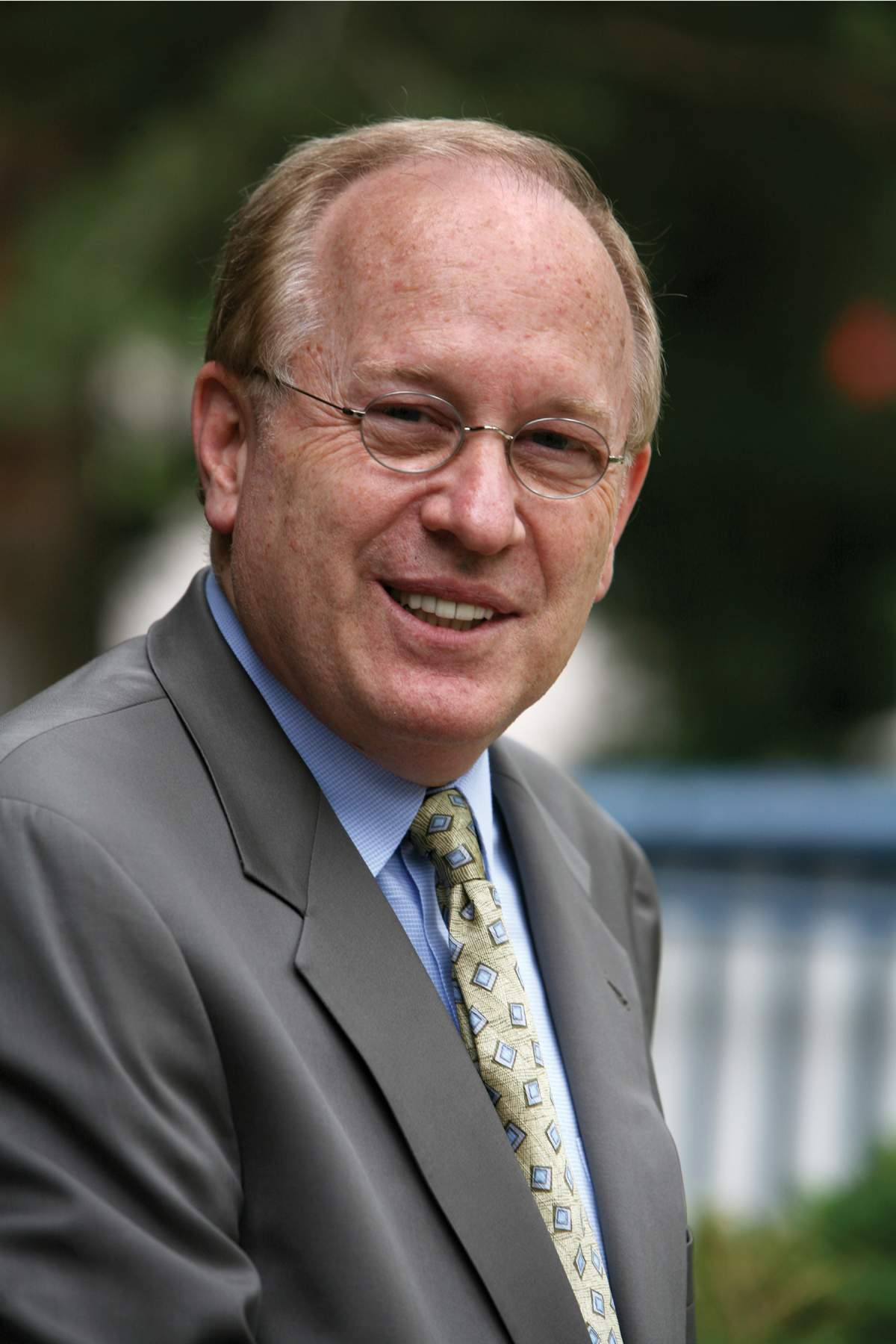
- Stuppler in 2007
- Born: December 23, 1944 (age 81)
- Occupation: Coin Dealer
- Years active: 1960–present
- Known for: Serving as President of the American Numismatic Association; Serving on the 2003 California State Quarter Commission
- Board member of: American Numismatic Association, Industry Council for Tangible Assets, and Professional Numismatists Guild
- Children: 4
- Website: www.mintstategold.com/investor-education

Barry Stuppler (born December 23, 1944) is an American coin dealer, consumer protection advocate, and a former President of the American Numismatic Association (ANA). In 2003, he served on the California State Quarter Commission that created the California State Quarter.

== Career ==
Stuppler has been a coin dealer for over 50 years; he is the founder of Barry Stuppler and Co. Inc. and its subsidiaries, Mint State Gold, CoinStats, and PQ Approved.

In 1989, Stuppler made a bid to purchase the Berlin Wall. He bid $50 million and stated that he had planned to sell the pieces. At the time, he was also the President of the Gold and Silver Financial Group.

Stuppler was a member of Governor Gray Davis' 20-person California State Quarter Commission in 2003. The commission created 5 concepts from which Arnold Schwarzenegger chose the final design.

Stuppler joined the American Numismatic Association in 1968. He served on its Board of Governors from 2001 to 2005, served as vice-president from 2005 to 2007. From 2007-09, he was president of the Association.

Stuppler serves as Chairman of the Gold & Silver Political Action Committee, a PAC founded in 2010.

He co-founded and serves on the board of the Industry Council for Tangible Assets. He also served on the board of the Professional Numismatists Guild, and in July 2017 was elected to a two-year term as President of the PNG^{10}. He is also President of the California Coin and Bullion Merchants Association. Stuppler served as Vice President of the Anti-Counterfeiting Educational Foundation in 2023 and became President of the organization in 2025.

He writes a "weekly market report" on the status of gold and silver, which has printed in Coin World since 2025.

== Awards ==
In 2004, he received the Century Club Award from the American Numismatic Association (ANA) for recruiting new members and the Professional Numismatists Guild's Abe Kosoff Founder's Award. He received the Exemplary Service Award in 2011.
