= Edward C. Rochette =

American numismatist

- Edward C. Rochette
- Born: February 17, 1927; Worcester, Massachusetts, U.S.
- Died: January 18, 2018 (aged 90); Colorado Springs, Colorado, U.S.
- Occupations: Numismatist, author
- Years active: 1966-2018

Edward Charles Rochette Jr. (February 17, 1927 – January 18, 2018) devoted nearly all of his adult life in service to the American Numismatic Association. His first exposure to the ANA was as an editor of The Numismatist from 1966 to 1972. From 1966 to 1986 he served as executive vice president. In 1987 he was elected to the ANA Board of Governors, and would serve as its president from 1991 to 1993. He returned to a staff position in 1998 and served as the executive director at the turn of the century.

== Literary career ==
Rochette has written a variety of numismatic books, including The Romance of Coin Collecting, Medallic Portraits of John F. Kennedy and Making Money: Rogues and Rascals Who've Made Their Own. Another aspect of his writing career included a weekly coin column that was nationally syndicated by the Los Angeles Times. Another column was contributed to COINage magazine, and he contributed to a monthly column in The Numismatist, "The Other Side of the Coin". A book of the same name, collecting a number of his columns, was published in 1985.

Before joining the staff of the American Numismatic Association, he served as executive editor of Numismatic News. He has been the recipient of the Numismatic Literary Guild's coveted Clemy Award and the Sandra Rae Mishler gold medal for original research.

He was instrumental in developing the International Olympic Committee's (IOC) numismatic exhibit at the IOC's museum in Lausanne, Switzerland. He also served as a numismatic consultant to the United States Olympic Committee and the United States Air Force Academy.

Rochette died January 18, 2018, at the age of 90 in Colorado Springs, Colorado.

== Numismatic honors ==
Rochette is a recipient of various honours, including the ANA Glenn Smedley Memorial Award, Lifetime Achievement Award, Medal of Merit, and the Association's highest honor, the Farran Zerbe Memorial Award in 1987 for Distinguished Service. In 2005, the ANA named their museum in his honor.
