= Ursula Kampmann =

German numismatist, historian and opinion journalist

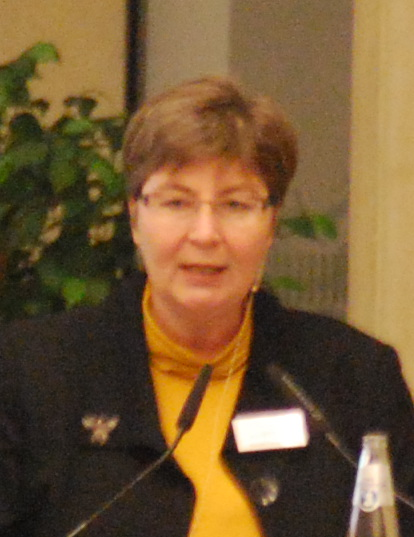
- Education: LMU Munich; Saarland University
- Occupations: Numismatist, journalist

Ursula Kampmann is a German numismatist, historian and journalist. She was elected a Fellow of the American Numismatic Society and in 2015 was awarded the Burnett Anderson Memorial Award for Excellence in Numismatic Writing

== Education ==
Kampmann studied Ancient History, Medieval History and Archaeology of the Near East at LMU Munich and Saarland University, with a special focus on ancient numismatics. In 1991, she was awarded her doctorate with a thesis entitled Die Homonoia-Verbindungen von Pergamon ("The connections of homonoia in Pergamon"). This study has been described as a "helpful work" which reflects " the "intense rivalry" between Pergamon, Ephesus and Smyrna in the first and second centuries AD.

== Career ==
In parallel with her academic studies, Kampmann worked in the numismatic trade. Between 1987 and 1990, she worked for the company Giessener Münzhandlung in Munich, and from 1992 to 2001 for the Swiss company Münzen und Medaillen AG. During this period of work in the numismatic trade, she began to devote herself to specialized journalism in this sector. From 1996, her articles were mainly published in the magazine MünzenRevue of which she has been editor-in-chief since 2002. She is also the founder of an international online numismatic magazine that has an English version, called Coins Weekly, and another in German, Münzen Woche.

Between 2001 and 2005, she worked at the International Agency for the Suppression of Coin Counterfeiting (IBSCC), of the International Association of Professional Numismatists (IAPN), which led her to publish a series of articles on coin counterfeiting. She is the spokesperson for the International Association of Dealers in Ancient Art, and has spoken out on the importance of protecting the right to collect. She described motivation for the interest as: "No journey back into the past could ever be so direct and concrete an experience as that of collecting."

Kampmann was elected a Fellow of the American Numismatic Society in 2020.

== Awards ==
- 2002: Vreneli Prize, awarded by the Swiss magazine Münzen-Revue on the occasion of the World Money Fair
- 2003: Prize of Honor of the Society of International Monetary History [de]
- 2012: Otto Paul Wenger Award [gl], from the Association of Swiss Numismatic Professionals
- 2015: Burnett Anderson Memorial Award for Excellence in Numismatic Writing
