= Empire State Numismatic Association =

Non Profit Corporation

Empire State Numismatic Association is a statewide non-profit corporation composed of clubs and individuals dedicated to the encouragement of the science of numismatics in New York.

== Member Organizations ==
- Rochester Numismatic Association
