= Oscar H. Dodson =

Oscar Henry Dodson
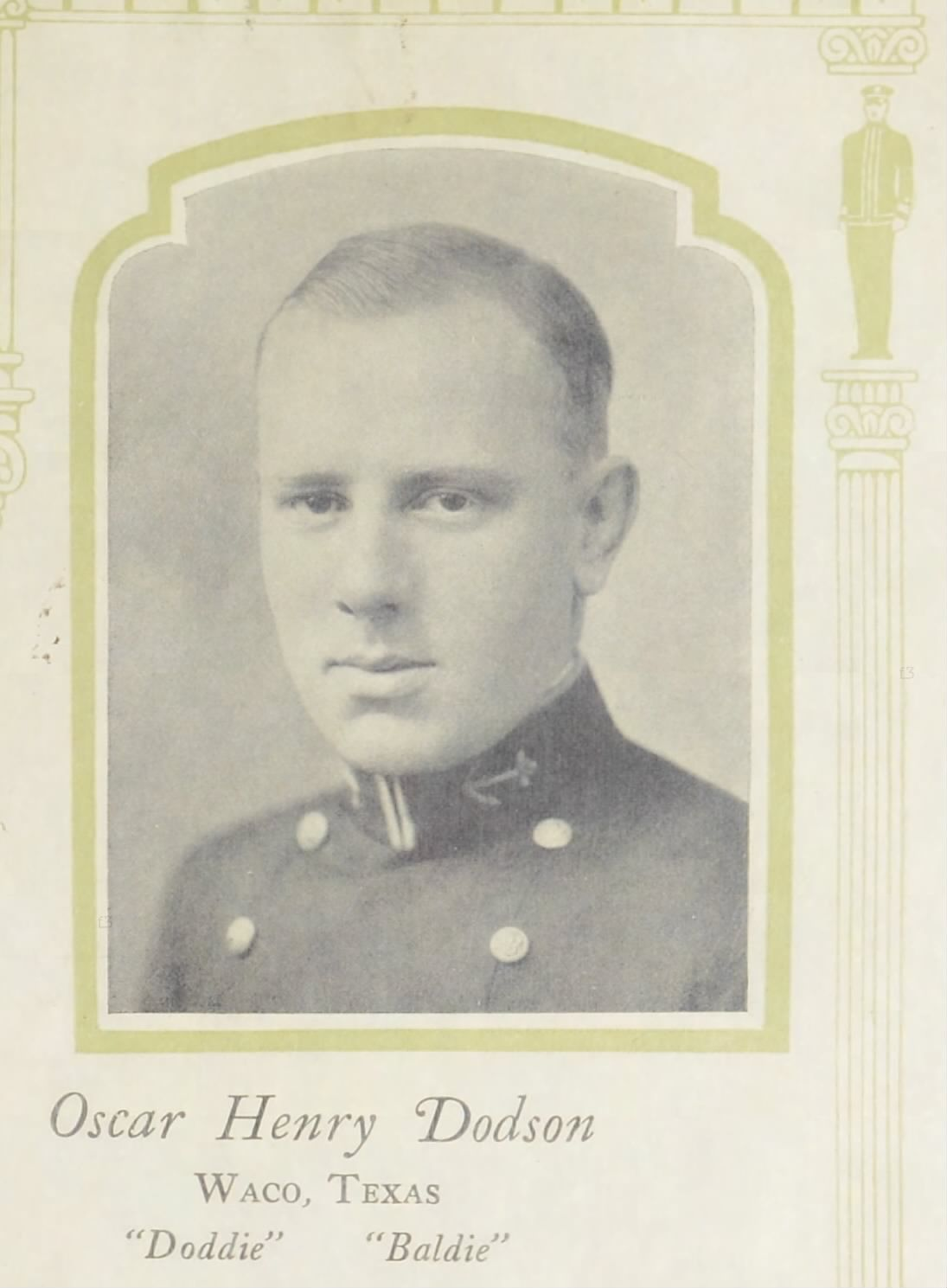
- Admiral Dodson in 1927
- Born: January 3, 1905; Houston, Texas, US
- Died: January 22, 1996 (aged 91)
- Military career
- Allegiance: United States
- Branch: United States Navy
- Service years: 1927–1957
- Rank: Rear Admiral
- Conflicts: World War II
- Awards: Silver Star

Oscar Henry Dodson (January 3, 1905–January 22, 1996) was a rear admiral in the United States Navy, who served during World War II. After retiring from the Navy, Dodson was appointed Assistant Professor of History at the University of Illinois. He was also a noted numismatist and served as president of the American Numismatic Association (ANA) from 1957 to 1961.

== Academics ==
Oscar Henry Dodson received a Bachelor of Science from the United States Naval Academy in 1927. He is also a graduate from the United States Naval Postgraduate School which lists him among its distinguished alumni.

In 1953, he graduated from the University of Illinois at Urbana–Champaign with a M.A. in Russian History. From 1957 to 1959 he served as Assistant Professor of History and in 1966 he was appointed Director of the Classical and European Culture Museum at the university.

== Military service ==
Oscar joined the Navy as an ensign in 1927 after he graduated from the Naval Academy. A brief history of his service is as follows:

- Commissioned ensign, United States Navy, 1927
- advanced through grades to rear admiral, United States Navy, 1957
- mobilization planning officer, Bureau Naval Personnel, 1945-1948
- commanding officer, United States Ship Thomas Jefferson, 1949-1950
- professor naval science, commander Naval Reserve Officers Training Corps unit, University of Illinois, 1950-1953
- commander, Landing Ship Flotilla, Atlantic Fleet, 1954-1955
- chief staff, United States Naval mission to Greece, 1955-1956
- chief staff, 1st Naval District, Boston, 1956-1957
- retired, 1957

=== Doolittle Raid ===
In 1942, he was on the USS Hornet (CV-8) when the Doolittle Raid was launched. He wrote an eyewitness account which was published in “The Hornets and Their Heroic Men”, a book by Hornet veterans Kenneth M. Glass and Harold L. Buell. His account was published on USSHornetMuseum.org with permission of the authors. His account includes quotes from the ship's Commanding Officer, Captain Marc Mitscher, and Jimmy Doolittle:

On the bull horn the ship’s company heard the familiar “Now hear this,” followed by the Captain’s voice, calm and distinct: “The HORNET will take the Army bombers to a launching position near Japan, where they will then take off to bomb Tokyo.” In the ship there was a moment of stunned silence, followed by wild cheers which rang throughout the ship.

CAPT Mitscher reminded all hands that the mission was secret and would remain so after the Army planes were launched. He also cautioned against throwing overboard any identifying papers—letters, magazines, ship’s schedule and the newspaper.

As the army group began preparations for the mission, Jimmy Doolittle gave each volunteer pilot and crewman the chance to withdraw from the mission. None did. He told them: “It is going to be a tight squeeze but we will make it. The targets are Tokyo, Yokohama, Osaka, Kobe and Nagoya. After bombing we will head for China, land for refueling at selected Chinese airports, then fly to Chungking. The Chinese Government is cooperating with us.” Doolittle selected Tokyo as his target and gave the other pilots a choice of cities they would prefer to bomb. He warned that no bombs were to be dropped on the Emperor’s Palace. Each B-25 would be loaded with three 500-pound explosive bombs and one 500-pound incendiary. Specific targets included armament plants, naval dock yards, railroad yards, oil refineries, and steel plants.

=== Battle of the Santa Cruz Islands ===
He received the Silver Star for his service as the communications officer on board the USS Hornet (CV-8) at the Battle of the Santa Cruz Islands. Dodson's Silver Star award states the following:

The President of the United States of America takes pleasure in presenting the Silver Star to Lieutenant Commander Oscar Henry Dodson, United States Navy, for conspicuous gallantry and intrepidity in action against the enemy while serving as Communications Officer on board the Aircraft Carrier U.S.S. HORNET (CV-8), during the operations of the U.S. Naval Forces north of the Santa Cruz, Islands, on 26 October 1942. Lieutenant Commander Dodson directed the reestablishment of radio and visual communications after all normal channels had been destroyed or rendered ineffectual by enemy bombs. Later, accompanied by a volunteer crew, he entered a compartment containing an unexploded bomb in order to destroy the ship's secret publications. Lieutenant Commander Dodson's gallant actions and dedicated devotion to duty, without regard for his own life, were in keeping with the highest traditions of the United States Naval Service.

=== USS Thomas Jefferson ===
He was commanding officer of the USS Thomas Jefferson (APA-30) 1949 to 1950 when it was assigned to the Military Sea Transportation Service.

== Numismatics ==
A numismatist most of his life, Dodson served as president of the American Numismatic Association from 1957 to 1961 and was responsible for bridging the transition between "traditional numismatics" and the then-new investment market. In the Centennial History of the American Numismatic Association, author Q. David Bowers wrote, "More than any other ANA president since August G. Heaton . . . Oscar Dodson was a philosopher."

He joined the ANA in 1933, and became life member number 78 in 1950 - the same year he received the ANA Medal of Merit. He served on the United States Assay Commission in 1948 and the Hobbies Committee of the U.S. State Department's "People-to-People" program.

In 1962 he authored the book Money Tells the Story published by Whitman Publishing. He also served as a contributing editor to COINage magazine from 1973 to 1987.

Two years after retiring from the Navy, he established The Money Museum at the National Bank of Detroit, serving as its director for six years. He also was honorary assistant curator of the ANA Money Museum. Through his generosity, many important ancient Greek coins and other items were donated to the Association. Oscar Dodson received the Association's highest honor, the Farran Zerbe Memorial Award, in 1968, and the ANA's Lifetime Achievement Award in 1995.

== Personal life ==
He married Pauline “Polly” Wellbrock Dodson on December 17, 1932. During World War II, she volunteered for the American Red Cross Gray Ladies. She was appointed to the United States Assay Commission to the Mint by President John F. Kennedy.
