= The Numismatist =

Monthly publication of the American Numismatic Association

- Cover of the January 2015 issue
- Discipline: Monthly special-interest magazine
- Language: English
- Edited by: Caleb P. Noel

Publication details
- History: 1888—present
- Publisher: American Numismatic Association (United States)
- Frequency: Monthly

Standard abbreviations
- ISO 4: Numismatist

Indexing
- ISSN: 0029-6090
- LCCN: 46040248
- OCLC no.: 01713845

Links
- Journal homepage

The Numismatist (formerly Numismatist) is the monthly publication of the American Numismatic Association. The Numismatist contains articles written on such topics as coins, tokens, medals, paper money, and stock certificates. All members of the American Numismatic Association receive the publication as part of their membership benefits.

== History ==
The inaugural issue was a four-page leaflet originally published in 1888 by collector Dr. George F. Heath in Monroe, Michigan, as The American Numismatist, in which he listed coins he wanted to purchase, advertised duplicates for sale, and discussed various topics. The name was changed to The Numismatist soon after. After Heath's death in 1908, Farran Zerbe purchased the magazine from his widow and continued its publication. The name was purchased by the American Numismatic Association in 1911 when W.C.C. Wilson bought the magazine and donated its rights to the organization for the benefit of its members.

In 1965, Q. David Bowers launched his Coins and Collectors column, which ran until 2021.

In December 2015, the ANA announced it had digitized every issue of the magazine.

In April 2020, longtime editor Barbara J. Gregory retired after 32 years as editor-in-chief and 39 years on the staff. She was succeeded in the position by Caleb Noel, who, at age 29, became the youngest editor-in-chief in the magazine's history. Under his leadership, the magazine premiered a redesign in October 2023.

=== The Reading Room ===
In November 2023, the Association launched an online publication, The Reading Room, described as "tailor-made for the tech generation". This new publication covers breaking industry news, features exclusive articles not featured in the magazine, publishes fan-favorite columns from The Numismatist two weeks before the digital edition is published, and features audio versions of articles on the go. ANA's YN Perspective has also been moved to the Reading Room and has become a biweekly publication.

== Content ==
The Numismatist includes feature articles and columns focusing on a wide range of topics. In addition to notes from the organization's president and the editor, letters to the editor, values for select coin series, and obituaries to honor recently deceased members, each volume includes:

- "Ancient & Medieval Coins" (published quarterly)—Rotating authors relate tales of coins from long ago
- "Around the World" by Ursula Kampmann – Discusses world coin stories
- "Auctions" by Andy Smith (published quarterly) – Highlights historic coin and paper money auctions in history
- "Bookworm" by Akio Lis (published quarterly) – Summarizes a themed selection of books from the ANA Dwight N. Manley Library
- "Budget-Minded" by Al Doyle – Gives advice about collecting various coins and paper money that cost $300 or less
- "Counterfeit Detection" by Numismatic Guaranty Company (NGC) – Discusses a counterfeit or altered coin in detail
- "Early American Money" by Ray Williams (published quarterly) – Discusses aspects of colonial, post-colonial, and early U.S. coinage
- "Getting Started" by Mitch Sanders – Provides tips for new collectors
- "Humor" by Jerry Cestkowski – Provides a joyful, fun-loving perspective on the hobby of coin collecting
- "Masterpiece" by Money Museum (published intermittently) – Features a large, detailed image and brief description of a piece from the Museum's holdings
- "Money Museum" by Doug Mudd – Features pieces and exhibits from the Edward C. Rochette Money Museum
- "Numismatic Chronicles " by Nancy Oliver & Richard Kelly (published quarterly) – Recounts stories related to coin series, historical hoards, and U.S. Mint records
- "One-on-One" by ANA Publications staff (published intermittently) – Profiles a member of the coin-collecting community using a Q&A format
- "Paper Money"—Rotating authors feature bank notes and other paper money
- "Tokens & Medals" by David Schenkman—Highlights various tokens and medals and the backstories of their creation
- "Treasures in Your Pocket" by Sam Gelberd – Features valuable coins that can be found in spare change
- "U.S. Coins" by David McCarthy – Relates stories about various U.S. coins and related topics
- "The YN Perspective" – Young numismatists share their thoughts and advice on topics of their choice
- ANA News – News and happenings from the American Numismatic Association, including convention recaps
- News & Notes – New releases from the United States and world mints and other currency-related current events and stories

== Distribution ==
All members of the Association receive the magazine as part of their membership benefits: silver and gold members receive a digital subscription while platinum members receive a print subscription.

In October 2019, Barnes & Noble announced that The Numismatist would be sold at over 600 stores nation-wide to increase circulation.
