= American Numismatic Association =

Numismatic association based in the US

- Type: Membership-driven
- Industry: History, research
- Founded: 1891; 135 years ago
- Headquarters: Colorado Springs, Colorado, U.S.
- Key people: Kim Kiick (Executive Director); Mark Lighterman (President)
- Products: Memberships, magazine, museum, library, conventions
- Website: www.money.org

The American Numismatic Association (ANA) is an organization founded in 1891 by George Francis Heath. Located in Colorado Springs, Colorado, it was formed to advance the knowledge of numismatics (the study of coins) along educational, historical, and scientific lines, as well as to enhance interest in the hobby.

The ANA has more than 24,000 individual members who receive many benefits, such as discounts, access to website features, and the monthly journal The Numismatist. The ANA's Colorado Springs headquarters houses its administrative offices, library, and money museum. The ANA received a federal charter from the United States Congress in 1912.

A board of governors is in charge of the ANA. Numerous advisory committees help to operate it properly. The ANA has a Young Numismatists program intended to promote interest among youth. The ANA has held annual conventions throughout the nation in most years since 1891, with two per year since 1978. The Chester L. Krause Memorial Distinguished Service Award is bestowed upon the most dedicated members. The ANA also maintains a Numismatic Hall of Fame.

== History ==
Dr. George F. Heath of Monroe, Michigan, gained knowledge of world history by studying his collection of coins. The obscurity of his community was an obstacle towards obtaining certain specimens, and made meeting fellow numismatists difficult. In 1888, he printed, published and distributed a four-page leaflet, NUMISMATIST, in which he listed his coin needs, advertised duplicates for sale, and discussed numismatic topics.

The nascent publication found many friends among other isolated collectors. As Heath's subscription list increased, a need for a national organization of numismatists was evident. The February 1891 edition of The Numismatist printed a question, "What is the matter with having an American Numismatic Association?" A follow-up statement was included: "There is nothing like the alliance of kindred pursuits to stimulate growth and interest."

On October 7 and October 8, 1891, five men—Heath, William G. Jerrems, David Harlowe, J.A. Heckelman and John Brydon—holding 26 proxies, met in Chicago with 61 charter members. The result was the founding of the ANA, which has since become the largest non-profit numismatic organization in the world. Heath then introduced the idea of a numismatic convention, where members could make personal contact with other numismatists. The first convention was held in 1891, then annually until 1895, and then in 1901 and 1904. After the 1907 convention in Columbus, Ohio, it was decided to hold annual conventions thereafter.

On June 16, 1908, Dr. Heath suddenly died. Farran Zerbe, then president, assumed the task of editing and publishing The Numismatist, and soon purchased the publication from Heath's heirs. In 1911, W.C.C. Wilson of Montreal, Quebec, Canada, purchased The Numismatist from Zerbe and presented it to the ANA. Since then, the magazine has been owned and published monthly by the ANA.

On May 9, 1912, the ANA attained national prominence as it was granted a Federal Charter signed by President William Howard Taft. In 1962, an amendment to make the Charter permanent and allow for a larger Board was introduced and passed by Congress and signed into law by John F. Kennedy on April 10. The amendment was presented by Congressman Wilbur Mills and Senator John L. McClellan, both of Arkansas.

An ANA national headquarters building fund was established on April 29, 1961. A site in Colorado Springs, Colorado was selected as the headquarter's location and a ground breaking ceremony was held on September 6, 1966. On December 20, the $250,000 building fund goal was reached and the new headquarters was dedicated and officially opened on June 10, 1967.

== Headquarters ==
The ANA's administration operates from its Colorado Springs headquarters. The ANA's monthly journal, The Numismatist, is produced here. Many articles are contributed by ANA members. The facility houses the largest circulating numismatic library in the world. Books, educational slide programs and instructional videotapes are loaned to members without charge other than costs to cover postage and insurance. The ANA has many affiliate club members throughout the United States, such as the Beverly Hills Coin Club and the Chicago Coin Club.

ANA headquarters contains the ANA Money Museum, which includes over 250,000 objects encompassing the history of numismatics from the earliest invention of money to modern day.

The Harry W. Bass Collection, a feature of the museum from 2000-2022, featured American gold coins, experimental pattern coins and paper money. The collection includes a complete set of three dollar gold coins, including the unique 1870-S specimen, a complete type set of U.S. gold coin designs from 1834 to 1933, and a collection of pattern coins from the United States Mint. In April 2022, the museum announced that the foundation was auctioning off the collection, with the proceeds going to various Dallas-area charities.

The museum also offers changing exhibits about money in history, art, archeology, banking and economics, and coin collecting. Members may study the items on display and, by prearrangement, can use other museum materials for research purposes.

== Membership ==
The ANA has nearly 24,000 individual members. Memberships last one year, three years, five years, or a lifetime. The cost of the latter differs, depending on a member's age and whether the ANA's magazine, The Numismatist, is mailed or read digitally. Membership is classified into five levels: silver, gold, or platinum, with a "life membership" option available for a one-time payment, and a youth option for kids under 18.

=== Dr. George F. Heath Society ===
In September 2022, the Association announced the launch of the Dr. George F. Heath Society, a donor recognition guild "devoted to supporting the mission of the ANA and its programming needs, while expanding, educating and inspiring the collecting community".

== Board of governors ==
The ANA is run by a nine-member board of governors composed of the President, Vice-President, and seven Governors, each elected by ANA members in odd-numbered years. Governor candidates must have been ANA members for at least three years. President and Vice President candidates must have served at least one term as a Governor. Total service on the Board is limited to 10 years.

The incumbent board of governors was elected in 2025. The election results were as follows:

Name	Position	Location	Votes Garnered
Mark Lighterman	President	Sanford, FL	N/A
Mary Lynn Garrett	Vice-President	Lexington, KY	N/A
Phyllis A. Ross	Governor	Sugar Land, TX	2,453
David G. Heinrich	Governor	Cleves, OH	2,397
Donna Moon	Governor	Orlando, FL	2,397
John S. Brush	Governor	Virginia Beach, VA	2,287
Henry Mitchell	Governor	Colorado Springs, CO	2,198
Kenny Sammut	Governor	Chadds Ford, PA	2,074
Seth Chandler	Governor	San Francisco, CA	1,988

=== List of ANA presidents ===
1. William G. Jerrems Jr., 1891–1892
2. George F. Heath, 1892–1894
3. August G. Heaton, 1894–1899
4. Joseph Hooper, 1899–1902
5. Benjamin P. Wright, 1902–1905
6. Albert Roemer Frey, 1905–1908
7. Farran Zerbe, 1908–1910
8. John M. Henderson, 1910–1912
9. Judson P. Brenner, 1912–1914
10. Frank G. Duffield, 1914–1915
11. Henry O. Granberg, 1915–1917
12. Carl Wurtzbach, 1917–1919
13. Waldo C. Moore, 1919–1921
14. Moritz Wormser, 1921–1926
15. Harry H. Yawger, 1926–1927
16. Charles Markus, 1927–1930
17. George J. Bauer, 1930–1932
18. Alden Scott Boyer, 1932–1933
19. Nelson T. Thorson, 1933–1935
20. T. James Clarke, 1935–1937
21. J. Henri Ripstra, 1937–1939
22. L.W. Hoffecker, 1939–1941
23. J. Douglas Ferguson, 1941–1943
24. Martin F. Kortjohn, 1943–1945
25. V. Leon Belt, 1945–1947
26. Loyd B. Gettys, 1947–1949
27. M. Vernon Sheldon, 1949–1951
28. Joseph Moss, 1951–1953
29. J. Hewitt Judd, 1953–1955
30. Leonel C. Panosh, 1955–1957
31. Oscar H. Dodson, 1957–1961
32. C.C. Tim Shroyer, 1961–1963
33. Paul K. Anderson, 1963–1965
34. Matt H. Rothert, 1965–1967
35. Arthur Sipe, 1967–1969
36. Herbert M. Bergen, 1969–1971
37. John J. Pittman, 1971–1973
38. Virginia Culver, 1973–1975
39. Virgil Hancock, 1975–1977
40. Grover C. Criswell, Jr., 1977–1979
41. George D. Hatie, 1979–1981
42. Adna G. Wilde, Jr., 1981–1983
43. Q. David Bowers, 1983–1985
44. Florence M. Schook, 1985–1987
45. Stephen R. Taylor, 1987–1989
46. Kenneth L. Hallenbeck, Jr., 1989–1991
47. Edward C. Rochette, 1991–1993
48. David L. Ganz, 1993–1995
49. Kenneth Bressett, 1995–1997
50. Anthony Swiatek, 1997–1999
51. H. Robert Campbell, 1999–2001
52. John Wilson, 2001–2003
53. Gary E. Lewis, 2003–2005
54. William Horton, 2005–2007
55. Barry Stuppler, 2007–2009
56. Clifford Mishler, 2009–2011
57. Tom Hallenbeck, 2011–2013
58. Walter Ostromecki, 2013–2015
59. Jeff Garrett, 2015–2017
60. Gary Adkins, 2017–2019
61. Col. Steven K. Ellsworth, Ret., 2019–2021
62. Dr. Ralph Ross 2021–2023
63. Thomas J. Uram 2023–2025
64. Mark Lighterman 2025-present

– Sources:

== Advisory committees ==
The ANA is also served by various advisory committees. There are temporary advisory committees for searches, and one formed for forming a Strategic Vision for the board in 2012. There are several more permanent advisory committees.

== Young Numismatists ==
The ANA has many programs for Young Numismatists (YNs). There are currently three stages in which YNs can earn free coins by completing the specified activities. The ANA's YN Program is considered the most advanced YN Program in the nation. For K-5, individuals do a program called the "Coin Explorers". This program will allow younger numismatists to complete activities. For grades 6-8, YNs can participate in "Money Study Buddies", which is a 6 step program. Currency Connectors is for grades 9-12 and is by far the most advanced. This path involved 5 different mini-paths each with 4 steps. The major topics around these paths are Early American Copper coins, Ancient coins, Paper currency, Exonumia, and Others. Aside, there is an Advanced YN Program which all ages can participate in and receive great coins. The ANA also runs several other programs including, Coins For A's, allows kids to get free coins, plus a basic-level ANA membership by getting A's in school. The ANA also has a YN Dollars program in which YNs earn YN Dollars for different activities. They can spend these YN Dollars at the ANA Summer Convention at the annual YN auction or monthly auctions. The Young Numismatist of the Year award has been given by the ANA every year since 1968. Many former winners of the award are now prominent numismatic professionals, or have distinguished themselves in other areas. Finally, the ANA hosts an annual literary contest for 3 age groups, elementary-middle school, middle-high school, and 18-25. First place winners will receive $500 in cash, $500 credit to Whitman, and a plaque.

The Young Numismatists of America (YNA) was a worldwide coin organization founded in 1990 at the ANA Summer Seminar. In its early days, the YNA was an attractive way for young numismatists (YNs) to submit articles for publication. However, by late 1996, many of the YNA founders were in college and could no longer help out. The YNA slowly faded away because of lack of interest. In 2001 at the ANA Summer Seminar, the young collectors decided to reform YNA. Within several years, the YNA once again ceased to exist. There has been a renewed interest as of 2025. In March 2025, many YNs, who were members of the ANA, came together for the first club meeting. In June 2025, the revamped club launched their official publication The Young Numismatist.

== Events ==
The ANA has held conventions annually most years since 1891, and expanded to two annual shows in 1978. The ANA offered a third show in 2011 and 2012, but announced on May 4, 2012 that it will not continue this in 2013. The features of these conventions include the offering of a large bourse room, along with exhibits, educational programs, junior member activities, auctions, and meetings of affiliated specialty organizations. The National Money Show and the ANA World's Fair of Money are the brands for shows that have been held on an Annual Basis by the ANA. The National Money Show is traditionally held in the Spring while the World's Fair is held in the Summer. The Fall shows in 2011 and 2012 also used the National Money Show brand.

The annual ANA Summer Seminar is an assortment of classes held in Colorado Springs mid-summer (generally the last week of June and first week of July). Most classes are one week long but some weeks have half-week classes available. Classes are taught by numismatic experts. Students are of all ages and are both collectors and numismatic professionals. The ANA and many local coin clubs sponsor a few scholarships to defer some costs for a few students. At each session of the ANA's Summer Seminar, the ANA deaccessions duplicate books.

=== Convention locations ===
Locations for the ANA Conventions.

Year	National Money Show (spring unless otherwise noted)	World's Fair of Money (summer)
2028		Chicago
2027	Virginia Beach, VA	Chicago
2026	Savannah, GA	Pittsburgh, PA
2025	Atlanta	Oklahoma City
2024	Colorado Springs, CO	Rosemont, IL
2023	Phoenix, AZ	Pittsburgh, PA
2022	Colorado Springs, CO	Rosemont, IL
2021	Canceled due to the COVID-19 pandemic (Originally scheduled for Phoenix)	Rosemont, IL
2020	Atlanta, GA	(Canceled due to the COVID-19 pandemic, originally scheduled for Pittsburgh)
2019	Pittsburgh, PA	Chicago, IL/Rosemont, IL
2018	Dallas	Philadelphia
2017	Orlando	Denver
2016	Dallas	Anaheim
2015	Portland	Chicago
2014	Atlanta	Chicago
2013	New Orleans	Chicago
2012	Spring: Denver; Fall: Dallas	Philadelphia
2011	Spring: Sacramento; Fall: Pittsburgh	Chicago
2010	Fort Worth	Boston
2009	Portland	Los Angeles
2008	Phoenix	Baltimore
2007	Charlotte	Milwaukee
2006	Atlanta	Denver
2005	Kansas City	San Francisco
2004	Portland	Pittsburgh
2003	Charlotte	Baltimore
2002	Jacksonville	New York
2001	Salt Lake City	Atlanta
2000	Fort Lauderdale	Philadelphia
1999	Sacramento	Chicago
1998	Cincinnati	Portland
1997	Cleveland	New York
1996	Tucson	Denver
1995	Atlanta	Anaheim
1994	New Orleans	Detroit
1993	Colorado Springs	Baltimore
1992	Dallas	Orlando
1991	Dallas	Chicago
1990	San Diego	Seattle
1989	Colorado Springs	Pittsburgh
1988	Little Rock	Cincinnati
1987	Charlotte	Atlanta
1986	Salt Lake City	Milwaukee
1985	San Antonio	Baltimore
1984	Colorado Springs	Detroit
1983	Tucson	San Diego
1982	Colorado Springs	Boston
1981	Honolulu	New Orleans
1980	Albuquerque	Cincinnati
1979		St. Louis
1978	Colorado Springs	Houston
1977		Atlanta
1976		New York
1975		Los Angeles
1974		Miami
1973		Boston
1972		New Orleans
1971		Washington, D.C.
1970		St. Louis
1969		Philadelphia
1968		San Diego
1967		Miami
1966		Chicago
1965		Houston
1964		Cleveland
1963		Denver
1962		Detroit
1961		Atlanta
1960		Boston
1959		Portland
1958		Los Angeles
1957		Philadelphia
1956		Chicago
1955		Omaha
1954		Cleveland
1953		Dallas
1952		New York
1951		Phoenix
1950		Milwaukee
1949		San Francisco
1948		Boston
1947		Buffalo
1946		Davenport
1945		NO CONVENTION
1944		Chicago
1943		Chicago
1942		Cincinnati
1941		Philadelphia
1940		Detroit
1939		New York
1938		Columbus
1937		Washington, D.C.
1936		Minneapolis
1935		Pittsburgh
1934		Cleveland
1933		Chicago
1932		Los Angeles
1931		Cincinnati
1930		Buffalo
1929		Chicago
1928		Rochester
1927		Hartford
1926		Washington, D.C.
1925		Detroit
1924		Cleveland
1923		Montreal
1922		New York
1921		Boston
1920		Chicago
1919		Philadelphia
1918		NO CONVENTION
1917		Rochester
1916		Baltimore
1915		San Francisco
1914		Springfield
1913		Detroit
1912		Rochester
1911		Chicago
1910		New York
1909		Montreal
1908		Philadelphia
1907		Columbus
1906		NO CONVENTION
1905		NO CONVENTION
1904		St. Louis
1903		NO CONVENTION
1902		NO CONVENTION
1901		Buffalo
1900		NO CONVENTION
1899		NO CONVENTION
1898		NO CONVENTION
1897		NO CONVENTION
1896		NO CONVENTION
1895		Washington, D.C.
1894		Detroit
1893		Chicago
1892		Pittsburgh
1891		Chicago

== Chester L. Krause Memorial Distinguished Service Award ==
The Chester L. Kraause Distinguished Service Award, (formerly the Farran Zerbe Memorial Award) is the highest honor conferred by the ANA. It is given in recognition of numerous years of outstanding, dedicated service to numismatics. The criteria for the nominee should be that the individual is considered someone who has rendered numerous years of outstanding service to the ANA as well as the field of numismatics. An additional qualification is that the nominee should be a former Medal of Merit and Glenn Smedley Memorial Award recipient. The award is limited only to members of the ANA.

- For a list of winners, please see Chester L. Krause Memorial Distinguished Service Award

== Hall of Fame ==
To enshrine the most important numismatists of all time, the ANA established the Numismatic Hall of Fame at its Colorado Springs headquarters in 1964. The Hall's constitution and bylaws were drafted that year, and the first inductees enshrined in 1969 and the next group in 1970, with subsequent honorees inducted every two years thereafter. The Hall was the brainchild of Jack W. Ogilvie, a Hollywood film writer and editor who served as ANA historian from 1950 to 1970.

Prior to each induction year, nominations are accepted from the membership. After review by a five-member Hall of Fame council, the names and qualifications of the nominees are passed on to a 25-member elector panel. Candidates receiving 13 or more votes are inducted; those receiving six to 12 votes are reconsidered in the next election. Members of the council, the ANA board of governors, and ANA appointed officers and staff are ineligible to serve as electors.

The nominees are considered in alternating annual cycles. "Historic Era" nominees (deceased more than 25 years prior to induction) are considered in odd numbered years, and "Modern Era" nominees (living or deceased less than 25 years) are considered in even-numbered years.

=== Inductees by year ===
Name	Year Inducted
Edgar H. Adams (1868–1940)	1969
George J. Bauer (1870–1961)	1969
Frank G. Duffield (1867–1954)	1969
George F. Heath (1850–1908)	1969
Edward T. Newell (1886–1941)	1969
Wayte Raymond (1886–1956)	1969
David C. Wismer (1857–1949)	1969
Howland Wood (1877–1938)	1969
Farran Zerbe (1871–1949)	1969
George H. Blake (1858–1955)	1970
Henry Chapman (1860–1935)	1970
Sylvester S. Crosby (1831–1914)	1970
Lewis M. Reagan (1904–1961)	1970
Moritz Wormser (1878–1940)	1970
Ole P. Ecklund (1873–1950)	1972
Albert R. Frey (1858–1926)	1972
Barclay V. Head (1844–1914)	1972
John M. Henderson (1870–1942)	1972
Lyman H. Low (1845–1924)	1972
Waldo C. Moore (1874–1953)	1972
Stuart Mosher (1904–1956)	1972
Burton H. Saxton (1876–1958)	1972
Agnes Baldwin Brett (1876–1955)	1974
John W. Haseltine (1838–1925)	1974
Joseph H. Hooper (1835–1910)	1974
B. Max Mehl (1884–1957)	1974
Howard Newcomb (1877–1945)	1974
William Philpott Jr. (1885–1971)	1974
Benjamin P. Wright (1857–1922)	1974
Frederick C.C. Boyd (1874–1960)	1978
Victor D. Brenner (1871–1924)	1978
David M. Bullowa (1912–1953)	1978
Lee F. Hewitt (1911–1987)	1978
J. Henri Ripstra (1881–1961)	1978
Richard S. Yeoman (1904–1988)	1978
Herbert M. Bergen (1897–1988)	1982
Elston G. Bradfield (1906–1977)	1982
J. Douglas Ferguson (1901–1981)	1982
Abe Kosoff (1912–1983)	1982
Robert McLachlan (1845–1926)	1982
Glenn B. Smedley (1902–1987)	1982
Louis S. Werner (1894–1982)	1982
Sheldon S. Carroll (1914–1998)	1984
William T.R. Marvin (1832–1913)	1984
Leonel C. Panosh (1893–1967)	1984
J. Norman Shultz (1893–1988)	1984
Eva B. Adams (1908–1991)	1986
S. Wolcott Freeman (1906–1967)	1986
Robert Friedberg (1912–1963)	1986
Eric P. Newman (1911-2017)	1986
Margo Russell (1919-2015)	1986
John S. Davenport (1907-2001)	1988
Maurice M. Gould (1909–1975)	1988
M. Vernon Sheldon (1902–1982)	1988
Chester L. Krause (1923-2016)	1990
John Jay Pittman (1913–1996)	1992
Q. David Bowers (born 1938)	1994
Clyde Hubbard (1916-2020)	1994
Aubrey E. Bebee (1906–1992)	1996
Kenneth E. Bressett (born 1928)	1996
Adam Eckfeldt (1769–1852)	1996
George D. Hatie (1910–1997)	1996
Harry W. Bass Jr. (1927–1998)	1998
R.W. Julian (born 1938)	1998
Oscar H. Dodson (1905–1996)	2000
Robert L. Hendershott (1898–2005)	2000
Edward C. Rochette (1927-2018)	2000
Russell Rulau (1926-2012)	2000
Amon G. Carter, Jr. (1919–1982)	2002
William Ewing DuBois (1810–1881)	2002
Bill Fivaz (born 1934)	2002
James Ross Snowden (1809–1878)	2002
Adna G. Wilde, Jr. (1920–2008)	2002
Clifford Mishler (born 1939)	2004
Catherine Bullowa-Moore (1919-2017)	2006
George J. Fuld (1932-2013)	2006
Robert Lovett, Jr. (1818–1879)	2006
Mathew Rothert (1904–1989)	2006
Neil Shafer (1933-2023)	2008
William Walter Coulthard Wilson (1869-1924)	2012
William C. Henderson (1916–1989)	2012
Al C. Overton (1906–1972)	2012
Alan Herbert (1926–2013)	2013
Beth Deisher (1946–)	2013
Vladimir Clain-Stefanelli (1914–1982)	2014
Ludger Gravel (1864–1933)	2014
David Schenkman (1939-)	2015
James Edward Charlton (1911–2013)	2015
Ralph A. Mitchell (1903–1991)	2016
Byron F. Johnson Jr. (1931–1988)	2016
Raymond W. Dillard (1925-2020)	2017
Joseph N. T. Levick (1828-1908)	2018
Arthur M. Fitts III (1936-)	2019
Augustus B. Sage (1841-1874)	2020
Barbara Gregory (1954-)	2021
D. Wayne "Dick" Johnson (1930-2020)	2021
Charles T. Steigerwalt (1858-1912)	2022
Jeremiah Colburn (1815-1891)	2022
Joseph E. Boling (1942-)	2023
James Mease (1771-1846)	2024
Kenneth L. Hallenbeck (1931-)	2025
David W. Lange (1958-2023)	2025
Louis Eliasberg (1896-1976)	2026
Benjamin G. Green (1860-1914)	2026
