= Farran Zerbe =

American numismatist (1871–1949)

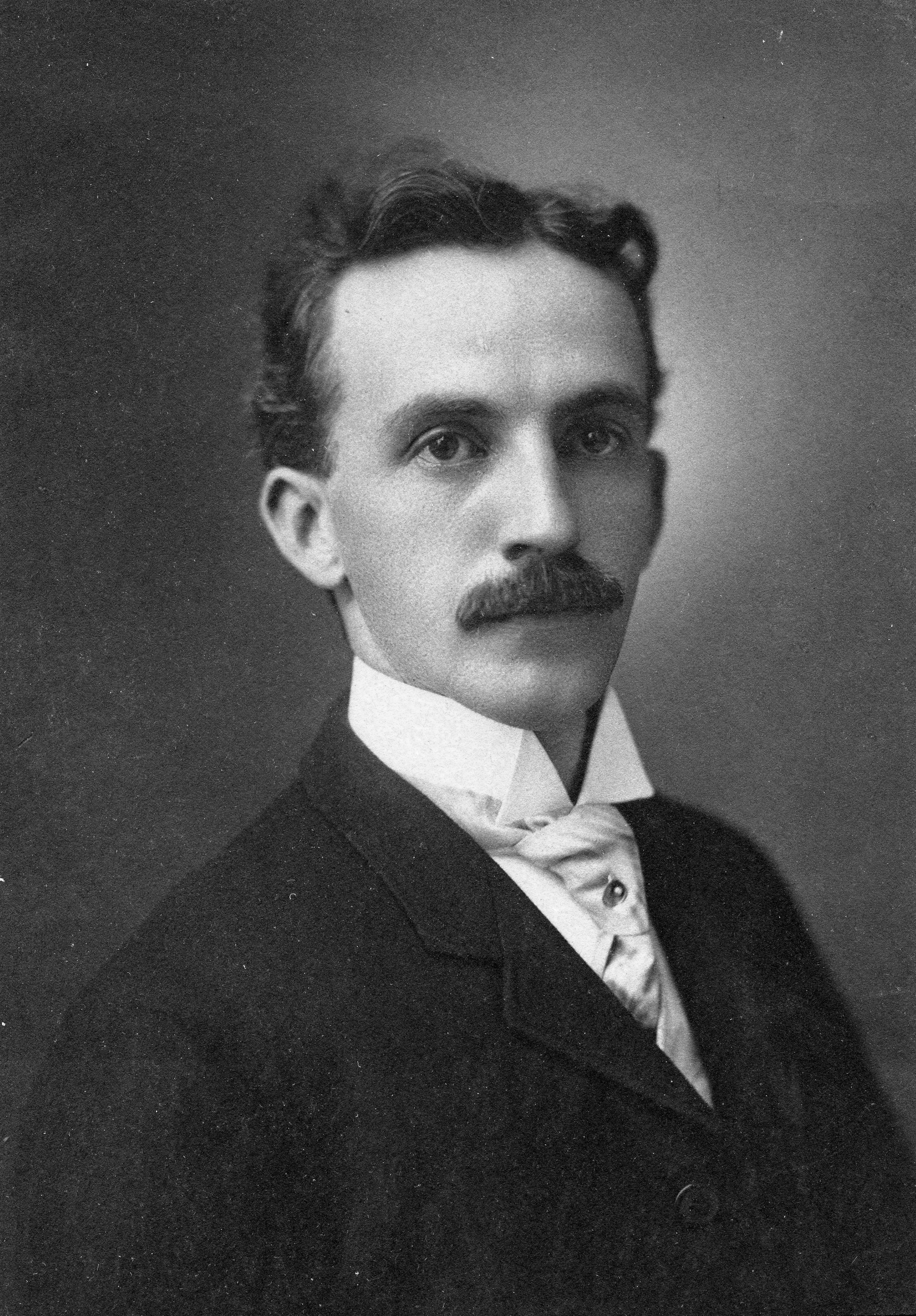
- Zerbe c. 1908
- Born: Joseph Farran Zerbe; April 16, 1871; Tyrone, Pennsylvania, U.S.
- Died: December 25, 1949 (aged 78); New York City, U.S.
- Occupation: Numismatist

Joseph Farran Zerbe (April 16, 1871 – December 25, 1949) was an American coin collector and dealer who was the president of the American Numismatic Association (ANA) in 1908 and 1909. He served as chief numismatist (person responsible for selling government coins) at the World's Fairs in St. Louis (1904), Portland (1905), (Note: The Lewis and Clark Exposition has not been officially recognized as a World's Fair but was informally referred to as such.) and San Francisco (1915).

Zerbe was born in Tyrone, Pennsylvania, in 1871, and became interested in coins as a child. By the time he was 20, he was running a corner store in Tyrone, alongside involvement in other businesses. He joined the ANA in 1900, and thereafter made his living from coins. Accumulating a major collection of numismatic items, he exhibited them at the fairs and at local banks throughout the U.S. for over 20 years beginning in 1907. The high prices he charged for the commemorative coins issued by the U.S. Mint for the World's Fairs, as well as the fact that some of the coins sank in value after the fairs closed, earned him a reputation among some numismatists as a huckster.

Zerbe rose rapidly in the ANA, elected vice president in 1904 and subsequently president in 1907. His tenure as president proved controversial, as he purchased the privately owned journal of the ANA, The Numismatist, from the heirs of its founder in 1908, a transaction that some believed should have been on behalf of the association. A factional fight followed; Zerbe won, with his chosen successor elected. He continued to exhibit his collection at banks until selling it in 1928 to the Chase National Bank, and then served as its curator until his 1939 retirement. In 1969, he was posthumously inducted into the Numismatic Hall of Fame. The ANA's highest honor, the Farran Zerbe Memorial Award, was awarded by the organization on an annual basis, until 2021 when the ANA Board of Governors voted to remove his name from the honor after that year's presentation. His other contributions to numismatics include the founding of the Pacific Coast Numismatic Society in San Francisco in 1915.

== Early life ==
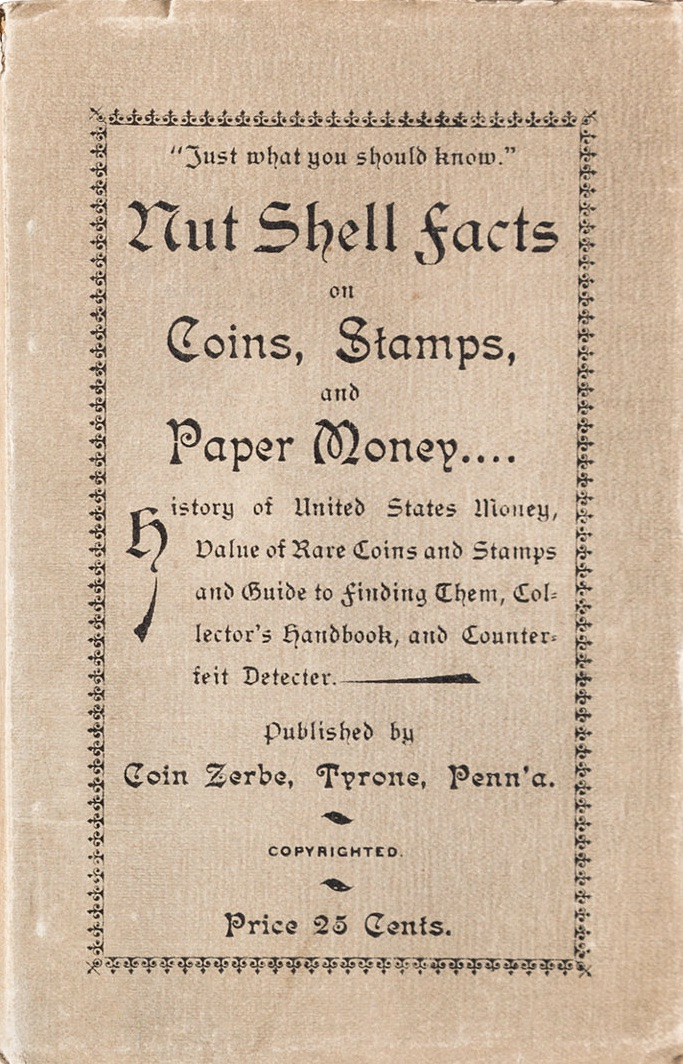
Zerbe's 1899 pamphlet Nut Shell Facts on Coins, Stamps, and Paper Money

Joseph Farran Zerbe was born on April 16, 1871, in Tyrone, Pennsylvania. His parents were James Albert, a messenger for an express company, and Bridget Mary Zerbe (née McAvoy). The Zerbe family was relatively comfortable, and Joseph (who dropped his first name while young) was educated in the public schools.

Farran Zerbe served as a newspaper delivery boy for the Tyrone Daily Herald from 1880 to 1889. By many accounts, including as told by Zerbe in his later years, his interest in coins was awakened when as an 11-year-old, a customer paid him with a silver French 50-centime piece, and the bank refused to accept it. Numismatist John P. Lupia III deemed this story more likely to be a lure to draw audiences (especially those who came to view his traveling exhibit of coins) into his story, and that it is more likely that the story Zerbe told in 1903 is true, that he became a collector of coins at age 9 in 1880.

By 1889, Zerbe had become the proprietor of a corner store in Tyrone, which sold a large variety of goods under the name "Zerbe Cycle Co." He also had involvement in other matters in Tyrone, running a news service under his own name from 1889 to 1890 and serving as editor of a local paper during the absence of the incumbent. He also sold collectible postage stamps, running a separate store. In 1899, under the name "Coin Zerbe", he published the pamphlet Nut Shell Facts on Coins, Stamps and Paper Money, which sold for 25 cents (equivalent to $10 in 2025).

== Numismatist of the World's Fairs ==
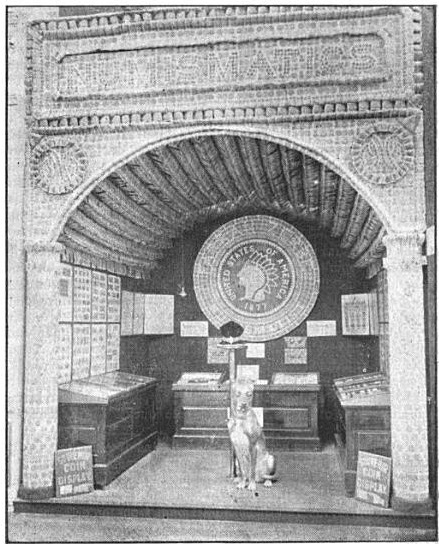
Zerbe's exhibit at the Lewis and Clark Exposition, Portland, 1905

In July 1900, Zerbe joined the American Numismatic Association (ANA), as member no. 197. Numismatist O.H. Dodson noted, "Zerbe's inquiring mind and zest for numismatic lore were quickly noted", resulting in his 1904 election as an officer of the society. In September 1900, he declared bankruptcy, which probably marked the end of his involvement with the corner store in Tyrone. Thereafter, his life would be devoted to collectibles, especially coins. A prolific writer, Zerbe published his first article in the ANA's journal, The Numismatist, in 1902; titled "Slugs and Stellas", it discussed certain rare U.S. gold coins, and was the first of more than 100 pieces he would write for that publication between 1902 and 1945.

In the first years of the 20th century, Zerbe began to show his traveling exhibit, "Money of the World". Numismatic writer David T. Alexander described Zerbe as "an energetic, self-promoting figure whose overall demeanor suggested a carny grifter rather than a distinguished numismatist". Some collectors lent items for the exhibit and could not get them back, though this was given little publicity as Zerbe began a meteoric rise in the numismatic world.

In 1902, President Theodore Roosevelt had signed legislation authorizing 250,000 gold one-dollar pieces to be struck by the Bureau of the Mint and paid over to organizers of the 1904 Louisiana Purchase Exposition in St. Louis as part of the government subsidy for the fair. The legislation was ambiguous enough to allow for multiple designs for the gold dollar, and Zerbe was among those who urged that this be done, saying it would boost sales. Other Zerbe proposals, such as a massive gold coin with a face value of $1 billion to be exhibited at the fair, were not adopted and reinforced views of Zerbe as a huckster. Nevertheless, at the recommendation of influential fellow coin-collecting enthusiasts, Zerbe secured the position of chief numismatist to the St. Louis fair, responsible for selling the coins and medals put on sale by the U.S. government, including the two varieties of the Louisiana Purchase Exposition gold dollar. Under authorizing legislation for early commemorative coins such as the issues that Zerbe distributed, the entire mintage was conveyed to the authorized commission, who made whatever profit it could by selling them at a premium to the public.

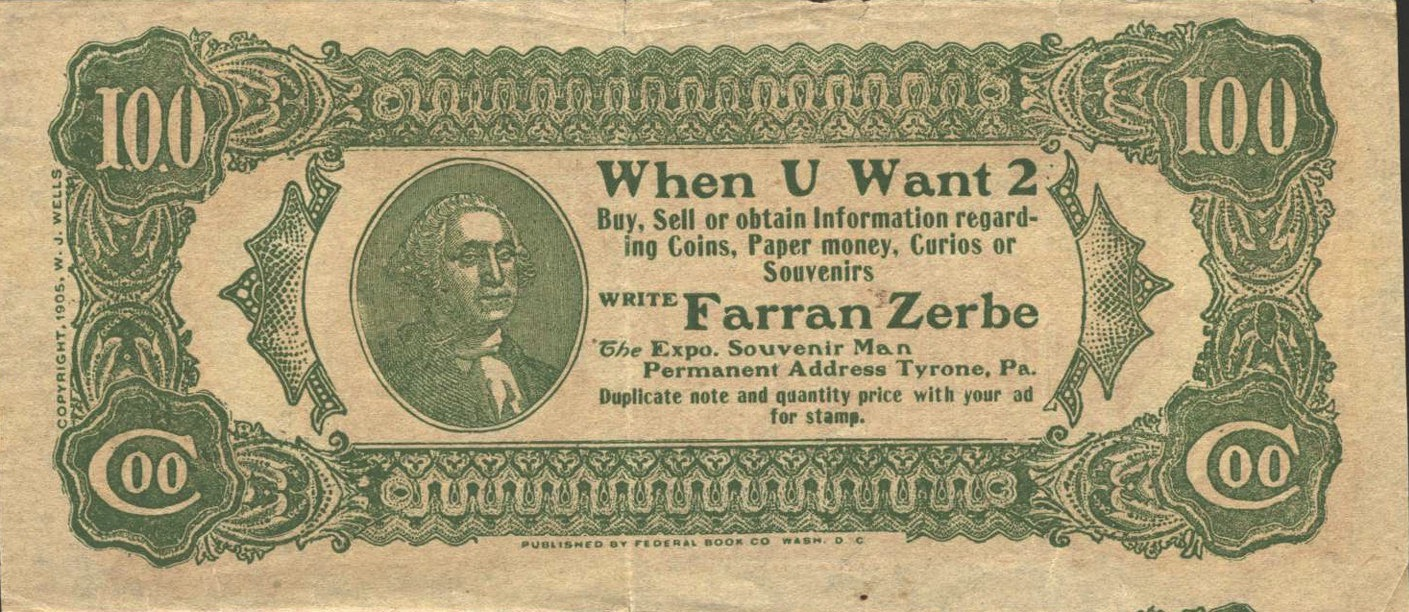
Advertising note for Farran Zerbe, 1905, describing him as the "Expo. souvenir man"

Zerbe, in addition to exhibiting his own coins at the fair, promoted the gold dollars. Pricing them at $3 (equivalent to $107 in 2025), an amount he stated was justified because regular-issue gold dollars commanded a premium, he also sold them mounted in spoons, jewelry and other items. He submitted articles to The Numismatist, both under his own name and anonymously, seeking to interest coin collectors in the dollars. Instead, few were sold, and he offended some coin collectors who concluded he was making misleading claims and putting the numismatic community in disrepute. Only 35,000 of the 250,000 coins were sold, many after the fair closed at just above face value to Texas coin dealer B. Max Mehl. More were taken by Zerbe himself, selling them for years afterwards at his Money of the World exhibit; according to Q. David Bowers, the price drops on the secondary market—from $3 down to $2 or even lower—"brought discredit upon Farran Zerbe", since he had assured purchasers that he would help maintain the price level.

In spite of these difficulties, when the 1904 ANA convention was held at the fair in St. Louis, Zerbe was elected first vice president of the organization; according to a 1961 article on Zerbe, this was because of his eloquence in addressing the convention. When he was not busy with his duties at the fair or as an ANA officer, Zerbe traveled extensively, visiting collectors and conducting research; in 1905, he wrote in The Numismatist of the preparations to begin coinage at the new Denver Mint, and found the New Orleans Mint temporarily not striking coins.

Armed with letters of recommendation from St. Louis fair officials, Zerbe next secured a position as chief numismatist to the 1905 Lewis and Clark Exposition in Portland, Oregon. In 1904, Congress had authorized the issuance of gold dollars to mark the Exposition, which Zerbe was tasked with marketing. Having learned from his experience in St. Louis, he asked $2 for these, or $10 for six. Some of these were dated 1904 and others 1905 and Zerbe tried to induce excitement by falsely claiming the 1904 issue was almost sold out, raising the price to $2.50. He was not successful, and two-thirds of the combined mintage of just over 60,000 gold dollars was returned to the Mint for melting. He also sold medals from the Mint at the Portland exposition. Zerbe's activities at Portland yielded him a profit of about $16,000 (equivalent to $573,000 in 2025).

== President of the ANA ==
Having completed his duties at Portland, on April 1, 1906, Zerbe boarded a coastal steamer for San Francisco. He conducted numismatic research and visited collectors, seeking information on topics such as the private issues of gold coins during the California Gold Rush, and was present during the San Francisco earthquake on April 18. Zerbe was uninjured, though furniture in the apartment where he was staying moved about and plaster and other items fell to the floor. Before he departed for Los Angeles to conduct more research, Zerbe aided those affected by the earthquake, and spent ten days gathering data and photographs for a contemplated (but never published) book on the event. In October 1906, Zerbe was the guest speaker at the first convention of the Ohio Numismatic Society in Columbus. In 1907, Zerbe mounted an exhibit at the Jamestown Exposition in Norfolk, Virginia, and unsuccessfully proposed a $2 silver coin to be issued for that fair.

Beginning in 1907, and continuing for more than two decades, Zerbe made arrangements with banks to exhibit parts of his collection in their lobbies. This benefitted both the banks, who saw an increase of deposits, and Zerbe, who not only got whatever the bank paid him, but had the opportunity to purchase old coins brought to him by members of the public. The exhibits also featured lectures by Zerbe, as well as leaflets about coins that contained favorable articles about banks, and which were imprinted with the bank's name. The exhibits, Zerbe convinced bank officials, were a dignified form of advertising.

New York numismatic scholar Albert Frey had been elected ANA president at the St. Louis convention in 1904. After serving three years, with Zerbe as first vice president, Frey declined to run again in 1907, and Zerbe was elected president at that year's convention in Columbus, effective in January 1908, with Henri Buck as first vice president. Zerbe pledged to build the ANA in membership and prestige, setting a membership goal of 3,000—at this time, the ANA had fewer than 500 members. Although he fell short of this, 364 people joined the ANA during Zerbe's two-year tenure, many sponsored by Zerbe himself.

On June 16, 1908, Dr. George F. Heath, founder of the ANA and proprietor of The Numismatist, suddenly died. Zerbe hastened to Heath's home in Monroe, Michigan, and found Heath's files to be disorganized, with no articles pending publication. Nevertheless, he purchased The Numismatist from Heath's widow and undertook to publish it himself. Combined with his presidency, this gave him near-total control over the organization. There were complaints that Zerbe should have purchased The Numismatist for the ANA, not for himself. At the 1908 ANA convention in Philadelphia, Zerbe secured re-election, with John Henderson as first vice president, and got the membership to approve a dues increase to improve The Numismatist, moving its place of publication from Monroe to Philadelphia and hiring three assistant editors. In 1909, President Theodore Roosevelt appointed Zerbe to serve on that year's Assay Commission, the annually-appointed commission made up of government officials and members of the public that checked to see that the gold and silver coinage met the required specifications.

Zerbe by then had enemies in the numismatic world, led by Thomas L. Elder, a New York dealer who considered him a charlatan and issued satirical medals accusing him of profiteering off the Louisiana Purchase dollars. The factional fight culminated at the 1909 ANA convention in Montreal, where Zerbe was not a candidate for re-election, but backed Henderson, with the Elder faction proposing Frank C. Higgins of New York. Zerbe weaponized The Numismatist for the election, refusing to allow Higgins or Elder to be mentioned favorably in its pages, and representing their positions in a negative fashion. According to Bowers,

Although details are not clear, it seems evident that Zerbe caused the ANA membership rolls to be padded by adding new members, men not at all interested in coins, simply to gain their votes for Henderson in the 1909 election. At the annual convention, held that year in Montreal, Zerbe had 400 proxies in hand for his pet candidate, Henderson, while Frank Higgins had just a few dozen. Higgins gamely threw in the towel and suggested that the convention unanimously elect Henderson, which it did.

With Henderson as president, Zerbe continued to control the ANA. Zerbe continued the news embargo against Elder, who responded by printing his own publications. After leaving office at the end of 1909, Zerbe tired of publishing The Numismatist, which did not make much of a profit, and in 1911 sold it to Montreal collector William Walter Coulthard Wilson, who donated it to the ANA. Zerbe apparently profited handsomely on the transaction, receiving what ANA archival papers described as a "long price" for the periodical.

== 1915 Panama-Pacific International Exposition ==
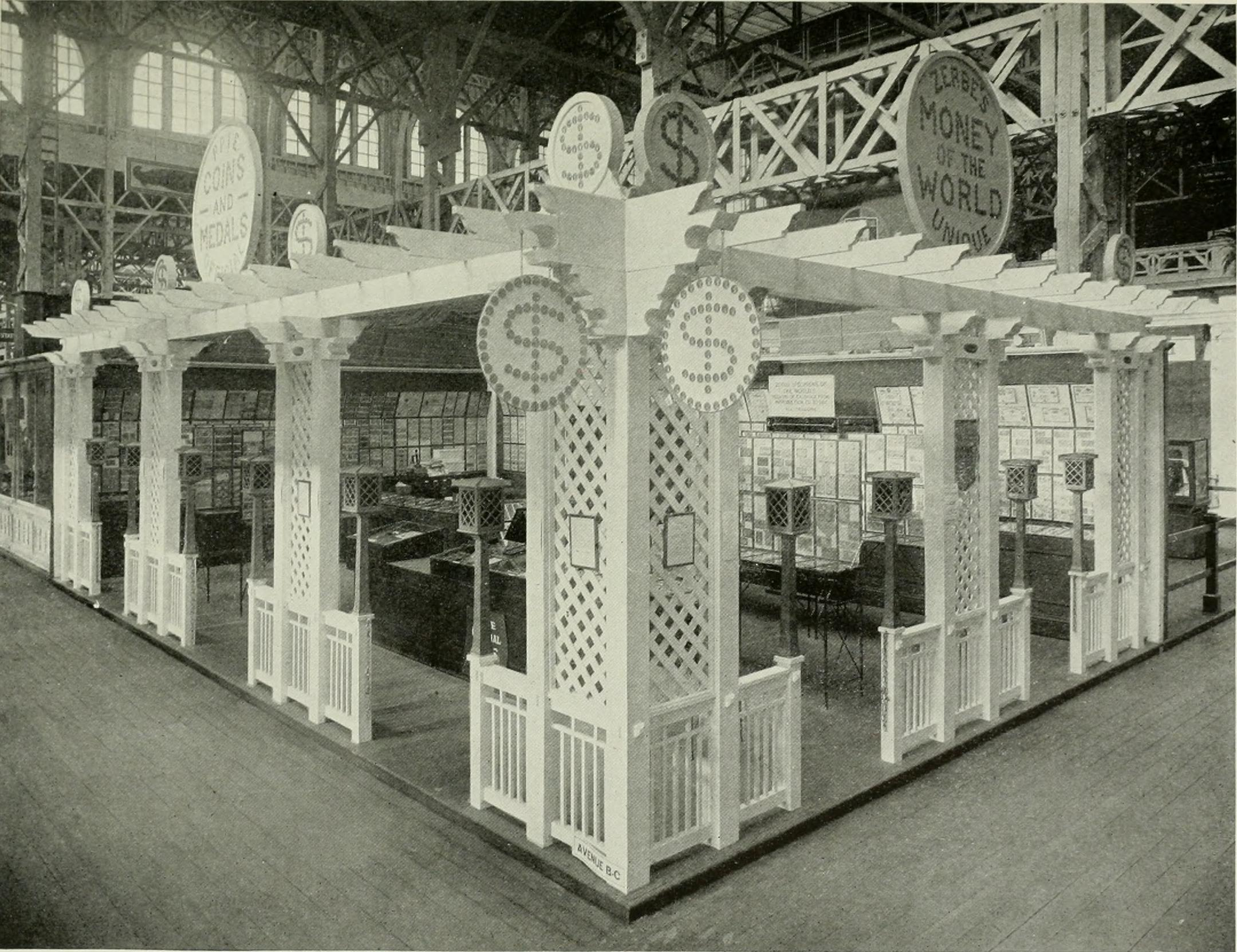
Zerbe's exhibit at the Panama-Pacific Exposition

In 1915, the Panama–Pacific International Exposition was held in San Francisco to both celebrate the opening of the Panama Canal and mark San Francisco's emergence from the devastating earthquake and fire of 1906. Zerbe was appointed head of the fair's numismatic department, overseeing the sale of the coins and medals the U.S. Mint issued to commemorate the exposition. In January 1915, Congress had authorized five coins, including round and octagonal $50 pieces. Zerbe also displayed his Money of the World exhibit and was present there almost continuously from the fair's February 1915 opening until its December closing. The Numismatist later printed an estimate that a third of the fair's 18 million visitors came to see Zerbe's exhibit, of which half a million heard the informal talks he gave, discussing the 50-centime piece he displayed and which he said had launched his interest in coin collecting.

Initially, the only government products Zerbe had to vend at his Money of the World exhibit were a souvenir medal, struck by a press operating at the Mint's exhibit, and prints produced by the Bureau of Engraving and Printing, also on-site. Sales of the medal were slow, and Zerbe did not have coins to sell until at least May 8. Zerbe found the coins hard to sell; many potential purchasers, faced with a plethora of medals, reproductions of Gold Rush-era pioneer gold coins, and other wares from a variety of vendors, did not believe his coins were official government products. Treasury officials agreed to allow him space for a salesperson at the Mint's exhibit, and the lower-denominations coins were sold there, with orders taken for the $50 pieces. Soon, though, Zerbe stopped selling the gold dollar there, and the rest of the fair's run was marked by conflict between him and Treasury representatives. The full legal allocation for each denomination had been struck, but though Zerbe continued selling coins by mail after the fair closed on December 4, sales dropped through 1916. Zerbe bought some of the surplus coins at face value, and the rest were returned to the Mint for redemption and melting.

Zerbe was present at the San Francisco Mint on June 15, 1915, for the first ceremonial striking of the octagonal $50 piece, and operated the press, striking the 19th piece. He wrote in a 1918 article in The Numismatist that the design of the $50 coin was not beautiful enough, and that different ones should have been used for the round and octagonal pieces; he did not blame the sculptor, Robert Aitken, who he wrote had done as well as possible given the need to produce the coins quickly. In the same year, Zerbe founded the Pacific Coast Numismatic Society (PCNS) in San Francisco. It is the oldest numismatic organization in the Western United States, and describes itself as fostering a strong tradition of research and literary publication.

== Later years, death and appraisal ==
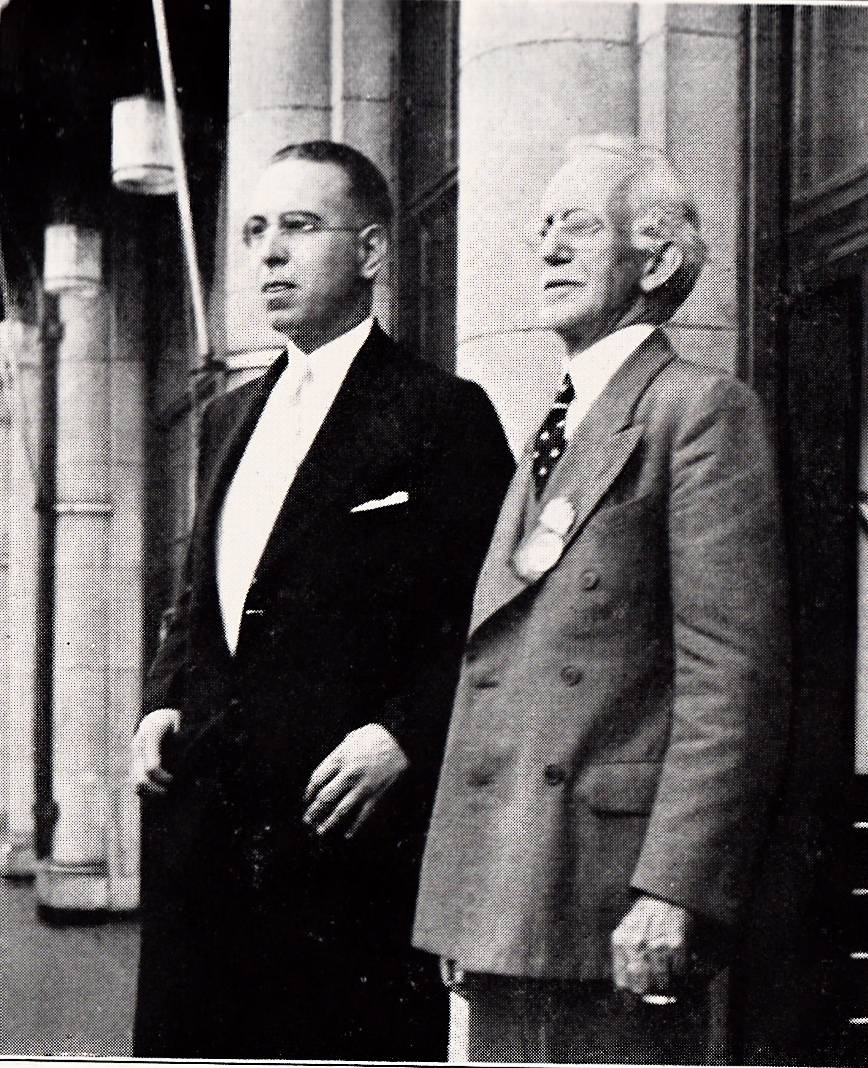
Zerbe (right) with his successor as head of the Chase Manhattan Bank Money Museum, Vernon Brown, c. 1939

After the San Francisco fair, Zerbe returned to the road and exhibitions of Money of the World. In 1919, he published a definitive catalog of Lesher Referendum Dollars, privately struck silver currency from Colorado. This so impressed Mehl that he reprinted it without permission, though the two men came to an amicable settlement. In 1926, a special issue of The Numismatist was published with Zerbe's detailed catalog of "Bryan money", pieces commemorating or satirizing the 1896 presidential campaign of William Jennings Bryan. Zerbe continued to publish articles for The Numismatist and other publications. In 1923, he was appointed for a second time to the Assay Commission, by President Warren G. Harding.

On August 25, 1920, at the ANA convention in Chicago, President Waldo C. Moore called on Moritz Wormser, Chairman of the Board, to read a paper from Zerbe. In his paper, Zerbe asked for a general circulation commemorative silver dollar, with the object of the coin to display America's desire for peace. Zerbe's writing stated: "Our example as a democracy ... was a mighty moral force that won battles without number in the hearts and in the minds of those who ultimately proved that they had the power to topple thrones". Others also called for a peace coin, and the Peace dollar was first struck in late 1921.

In 1928 and 1929, Zerbe served as chair of the Board of Governors of the ANA. In 1928, Zerbe sold his collection and library to the Chase National Bank, which had exhibited Money of the World two years earlier. The bank opened a money museum, with Zerbe as curator, in 1929. Under the agreement, he was allowed to add to the collection, or take any part of it on loan for exhibit elsewhere. He remained curator until his retirement in 1939, after which he was curator emeritus. The Chase Manhattan Bank Money Museum remained open until 1977, after which many of the pieces were donated to the National Numismatic Collection at the Smithsonian Institution.

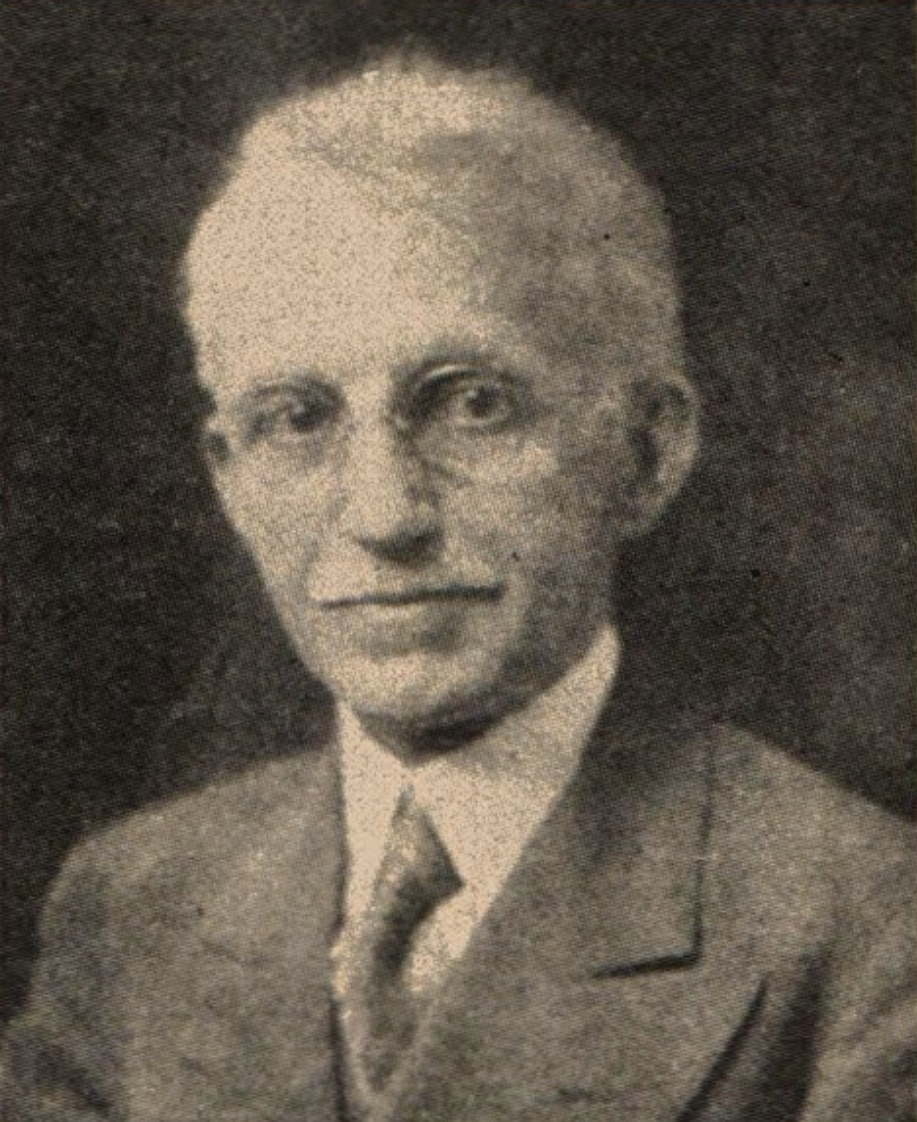
Zerbe in the 1940s

Zerbe had been married to, and divorced from, Bessie Garner Knox in the 1910s; he married again, to Julia Gertrude Mahoney, in 1932. He continued to be honored by the numismatic community. In 1931, the PCNS struck a special medal honoring Zerbe as its founder, while the following year, the Chase Bank gave a special luncheon honoring Zerbe's fifty years in coin collecting. In 1944, he was named an Honorary Life Member of the ANA, and the following year was made historian of the organization, a post in which he served until his death.

Zerbe died on December 25, 1949, in New York City, after an illness of over two months. He was survived by his second wife Julia, and by two brothers. In 1951, the ANA renamed its Annual Award, its highest honor, the Farran Zerbe Memorial Award. Only ANA members were eligible for this award "given in recognition of numerous years of outstanding, dedicated service to numismatics". In 2021, the ANA Board of Governors, at the request of nearly 20 Zerbe Award winners, voted to remove his name from the award after that year's presentation. The press release cited inflated claims made by Zerbe in connection with the 1904 gold dollar, and irregularities in connection with the purchase of The Numismatist and with Zerbe's involvement in the 1909 election.

Zerbe was elected to the Numismatic Hall of Fame in 1969. Alexander stated that "as long as the ANA exists, Farran Zerbe will continue to live". According to Lupia, Zerbe had "pure genius ... as a clever businessman and numismatic aficionado to lure people into, not merely his show, but into the love of numismatics". Bowers noted, "Whether Zerbe was an idol with feet of clay whose indiscretions of 1908–09 should be overlooked is a matter of debate." Dodson wrote that Zerbe, despite his limited education, "accomplished more than the combined efforts of a host of learned scholars in publicizing numismatics at the grass roots level". Zerbe's successor as ANA historian, Jack W. Oglivie, deemed him second only to Heath in work done to make the ANA a success, and dubbed him a "pioneer who did so much to popularize numismatics. His noteworthy achievements have truly earned him the title, 'Dean of American Numismatists'."

== Sources ==
- "Proceedings of the Annual Convention of the American Numismatic Association, Held at Chicago, Ill., August 23 to 26, 1920". The Numismatist: 417–454. October 1920.
- Alexander, David (September 27, 2016). "Farran Zerbe: Numismatist – Promoter – Hustler". CoinWeek.
- Alexander, David (July 31, 2017). "10 great moments that shaped American coin collecting, part 1". CoinWeek.
- Bowers, Q. David (June 1990). "A Centennial History Report". The Numismatist: 939–942.
- Bowers, Q. David (1992). Commemorative Coins of the United States: A Complete Encyclopedia. Bowers and Merena Galleries, Inc. ISBN 978-0-943161-35-8.
- Brand, H.A. (May 1958). "Incident in the Life of Farran Zerbe". The Numismatist: 545–546.
- Burdette, Roger W. (2007). Renaissance of American Coinage, 1909–1915. Seneca Mill Press. ISBN 978-0-9768986-2-7.
- Dodson, O.H. (September 1969). "The Legendary Farran Zerbe". The Numismatist: 1195–1206.
- Hunt, Jim; Wells, Jim (March 2004). "Numismatics of the Lewis and Clark Exposition". The Numismatist: 40–44.
- Lupia, John N. III. "Zerbe, Joseph Farran". Encyclopedic Dictionary of Numismatic Biographies. Archived from the original on July 11, 2021.
- Oglivie, Jack W. (June 1950). "Farran Zerbe: Honorary Member of the A.N.A.". The Numismatist: 351–352.
- Oglivie, Jack W. (September 1961). "Farran Zerbe: Seventh President, 1908 and 1909". The Numismatist: 1175–1178.
- Smith, Pete (August 1998). "Zerbe Took His Collection on the Road". The Numismatist: 898–899.
- Swiatek, Anthony (2012). Encyclopedia of the Commemorative Coins of the United States. KWS Publishers. ISBN 978-0-9817736-7-4.
- Turrill, Charles B. (September 1921). "The Story of a Numismatic Achievement". The Numismatist: 379–381.
- Zerbe, Farran (January 1908). "A Message from the President". The Numismatist: 12–18.
