= B. Max Mehl =

American coin dealer (1884–1957)

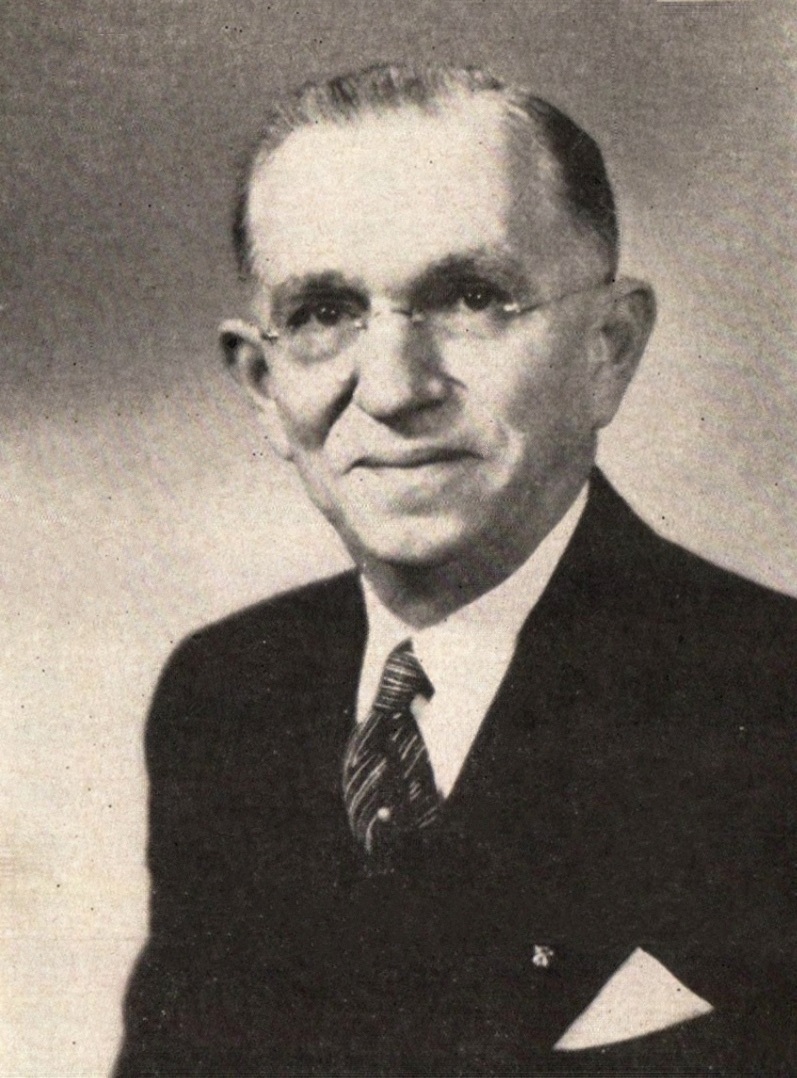
- Mehl c. 1950
- Born: Benjamin Maximillian Mehl; November 5, 1884; Łódź, Congress Poland, Russian Empire (now Poland)
- Died: September 28, 1957 (aged 72); Fort Worth, Texas, U.S.
- Resting place: Greenwood Cemetery (Beth-El section), Fort Worth, Texas
- Occupation: Coin dealer
- Spouse: Ethel Rosen (m. 1907)

Benjamin Maximillian Mehl (November 5, 1884 – September 28, 1957), usually known as B. Max Mehl, was an American dealer in coins, selling them for over half a century. The most prominent dealer in the United States through much of the first half of the 20th century, he is credited with helping to expand the appeal of coin collecting from a hobby for the wealthy to one enjoyed by many.

Mehl was born in Congress Poland, which was part of the Russian Empire. His family brought him to what is now Lithuania, and then to the United States, settling in Fort Worth, Texas, where he lived for almost all of his adult life. While still a teenager, he began to sell coins, which he had previously collected. Joining the American Numismatic Association (ANA) in 1903 at age 18, he quickly became a full-time coin dealer, and by 1910 was one of the most well known in the country.

During his half-century of coin dealing, his customer list included Franklin D. Roosevelt, Winston Churchill and Colonel E. H. R. Green. He sold coins from the collections of important numismatists (coin collectors) at auction, including Jerome Kern and King Farouk. Mehl was the first dealer to advertise in non-numismatic publications, helping to broaden the appeal of the hobby. He claimed to have spent over a million dollars on advertisements offering to buy a 1913 Liberty Head nickel for $50, though he knew there were none in circulation to be found. This got the public to search through their pocket change looking for rare coins that Mehl might buy, and greatly increased sales of Mehl's coin books, adding to his profit.

Many of his great auction sales took place in the 1940s, but by the following decade, he was becoming less active, and he died in 1957; his business continued into the 1960s. Mehl was elected to the Numismatic Hall of Fame in 1974, and to the CoinFacts Dealer Hall of Fame in 2010.

== Early life ==
Benjamin Maximillian Mehl was born on November 5, 1884, (Note: Sources do not specify whether this is a Gregorian calendar date or Julian calendar, then in use in the Russian Empire, where Mehl was born.) in Łódź, in what was then Congress Poland within the Russian Empire. His parents, Solomon Isaac Mehl and Rachel Mehl, lived in the Jewish Quarter of Łódź, known as Altstadt. Mehl means "meal" (as in ground grain, or flour), and in a time and place when last names were often descriptive of the family trade, the Mehls may have been itinerant millers. Rachel Mehl's last name at birth was Goldstick.

In 1885, the Mehl family, including Benjamin, moved to Vilkomu, in the province of Kovno (modern day Kaunas, Lithuania). There was a growing Jewish community, and Benjamin received his initial education in its school. According to a 1906 biographical sketch, he collected coins from early childhood, and was unable to recall a time when he was not interested in them.

Seeking greater opportunities, in 1895 the Mehl family, including Benjamin, immigrated to the United States, arriving there in April of that year. They initially lived in New York, and settled for a time in Denton, Texas before moving to Fort Worth, likely because Rachel Mehl had family there. Benjamin was educated in the public schools of Fort Worth. A synagogue was built in Fort Worth in 1895, which the Mehls joined; sometime around 1897, Benjamin was called to the Torah as a bar mitzvah. While attending school, Benjamin, along with his three older brothers and one older sister, was employed in the clothing store Solomon Mehl opened at 1211 Main Street in Fort Worth. He left school at age 16 and became employed full-time as a clerk at the store.

From the age of 10, Benjamin collected cigar bands, then stamps, then coins. He dated his start as a coin dealer to 1900, likely with unusual coins taken from the cash register with his father's approval as part of his pay. In June 1903, he applied to become a member of the American Numismatic Association (ANA), giving the Main Street address, and using the name "B. Max Mehl"—he would never use his first name in print. ANA Secretary George F. Heath noted in the ANA's journal, The Numismatist, that the thirteen applicants that month had ages ranging from 18 (Mehl's age) to 65, describing the applications as progress towards the time when every reputable coin collector or student of numismatics belonged to the ANA, adding, "the fires in the Temple of Numisma burn on and on forever." In listing the collecting interests of the applicants, Heath stated that Mehl "collects only U.S. Colonial and Territorial gold and paper money". Each application was subject to no objection being lodged against the prospective member, and Mehl was approved, becoming ANA member number 522 on July 1, 1903.

== Early career (1903–1920) ==
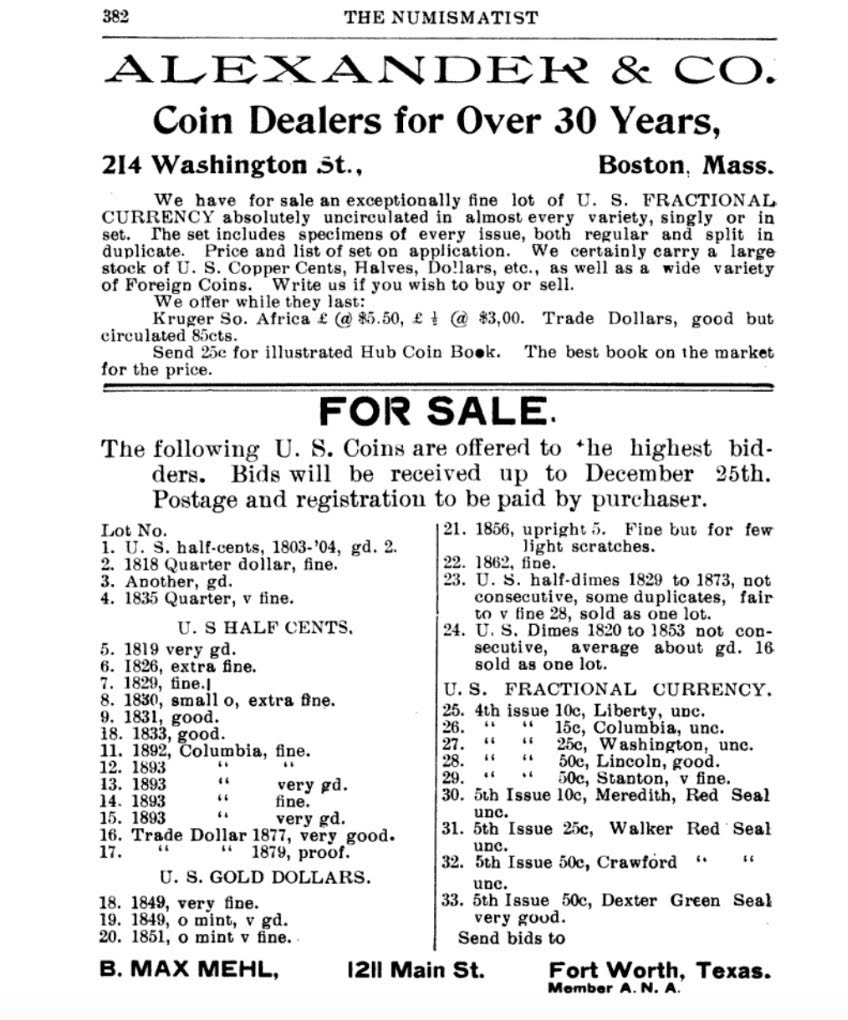
Page from The Numismatist containing Mehl's first ad, December 1903

Mehl's first published words in The Numismatist appeared in August 1903. Likely part of a letter to Secretary Heath endorsing the magazine, they read, "I am indeed more than pleased with The Numismatist and think it is the best publication of its kind." In October 1903, that journal reported a change of address for Mehl to Box 24, Alvord, Texas. In 1903, he joined the British Numismatic Society. Mehl's first mail-order advertisement appeared in the December 1903 issue of The Numismatist, selling 33 U.S. coins on a highest-bidder basis. Q. David Bowers, in a 1999 article on Mehl, found it logical that Mehl would focus on the mail order business given Fort Worth's distance from numismatic centers such as New York and Philadelphia—there would be few local collectors to patronize a coin shop in "Cow Town", as Fort Worth was known. By this time Mehl had returned to using the address on Main Street in Fort Worth. The sale was likely not a success, as most of the coins were listed on a circular Mehl sent by mail in January 1904, but the following month, he placed his first full-page advertisement in The Numismatist. According to numismatic author John N. Lupia III, "Apparently he was a smashing success from 1904 on." Mehl was aided in becoming a major coin dealer by C.W. Cowell, a Coloradan who was selling his collection, who sent many rare pieces to Mehl on consignment, allowing him to offer rarities that otherwise would have been beyond his means.

The February 1904 advertisement offered The Hub Coin Book for sale for $.25 (equivalent to $9 in 2025), although in an unfortunate misspelling in the ad, the "k" in Book was rendered as a "b". This book, published by Alexander & Co. of Boston, was widely-sold, and coin dealers could order copies imprinted with their name and address for sale to the public for a small fee. Mehl did so, and sent out copies advertising himself, seeking to promote his business. In 1906, he published the first edition of The Star Coin Book: An Encyclopedia of Rare American and Foreign Coins, sold for ten cents and heavily copied from The Hub Coin Book. Heath described The Star Coin Book as a "well illustrated sixty-four page pamphlet giving prices he pays for coins, particularly the American series, and much other valuable information". Beginning in 1908, Mehl published the more thorough The Star Rare Coin Encyclopedia, which by 1924 had an annual sale of 70,000 copies. These sold for $1 (the price later increased) to members of the public who were hopeful of picking a valuable coin out of their pocket change.

Mehl ad in Collier's, 1908

Mehl did not limit himself to advertisements in the numismatic press. Beginning in 1904, he placed classified ads in the Fort Worth Telegram. In 1906, he became the first coin dealer to advertise in the national non-numismatic press, with five lines in Collier's magazine, at an expense of $12.50. This proved successful as an advertising strategy, helping to transform coin collecting, once a niche hobby for the wealthy and for students of art and archeology, into a pastime for the masses.

In 1906, Mehl came east for the first time, visiting New York and the coin business of Lyman H. Low for his first coin auction, where he proved an active participant. Numismatist Farran Zerbe commented on Mehl's youth. Mehl also visited Boston and Philadelphia. In July 1906, he wrote to his customers that he was now a full-time coin dealer, something that likely came as a surprise to many of them, who assumed that he had long been one. According to Bowers, "by 1910, his innovative advertising and colorful personality projected him to the first rank of dealers."

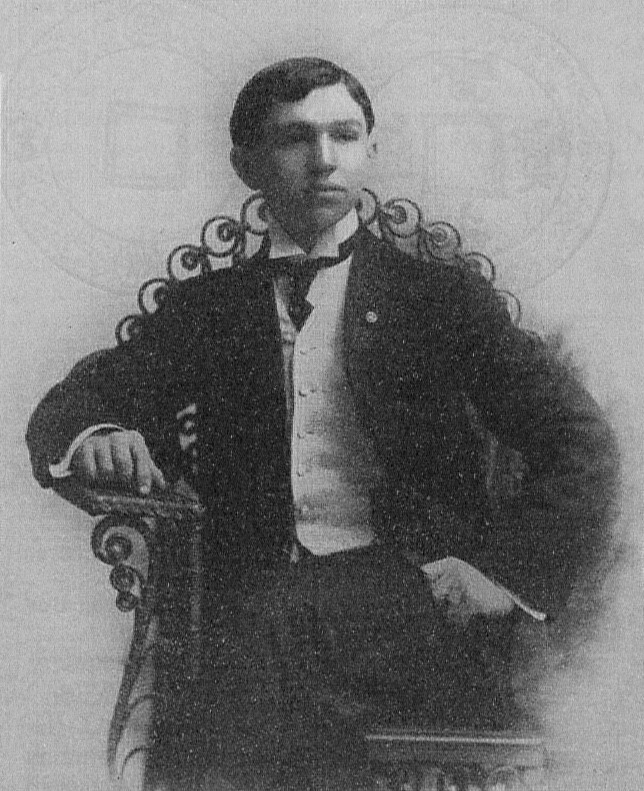
Mehl in 1906

By 1907, Mehl had opened his own office at 1309 Main Street in Fort Worth. On August 18, 1907, Mehl and Ethel Rosen married, in the parlor of Ethel's uncle, Northside Fort Worth developer Sam Rosen. Ethel Mehl's family also had roots in Lithuania. They had two daughters, Lorraine and Danna.

In January 1908, Mehl began to publish Mehl's Numismatic Monthly, with guest contributors including some of the leading numismatists of the day. Published until 1919 with a hiatus in 1911–1912, according to Bowers it "gave The Numismatist a run for its money and in many aspects was more interestingly edited". When Heath, the editor of The Numismatist, died unexpectedly in 1908, Mehl offered the Numismatic Monthly as a replacement journal for the ANA, but Zerbe took over The Numismatist and continued it. In 1912, Mehl moved to New York to join fellow dealer Wayte Raymond in a partnership. Mehl was concerned about his relative isolation in Texas from the rest of the numismatic world. However, after only a few weeks, Mehl returned to Fort Worth, writing in The Numismatist that serious illness in his family had required his return, and personal matters then obliged him to remain. He stated that he had re-established himself on as large a scale as before.

In 1916, Mehl engaged local architect Wiley G. Clarkson to design a three-story, 16,000-square-foot office building of brick, ornamented with stone bas-reliefs of antique coins. Located at 1200 W. Magnolia Avenue, the building was the working place of Mehl and 40 employees (an increase from 10 in 1912) who dealt with correspondence and orders from a subscription list of 70,000 customers. In the years to come, these would include Franklin D. Roosevelt, Winston Churchill and King Farouk of Egypt.

Mehl was one of the largest dealers in early United States commemorative coins, and the only one to make them a major part of his business in the 1916–1920 era, including Columbian half dollars in groups and packets of coins sold to beginning collectors. When the promoters of the 1916- and 1917-dated McKinley Birthplace Memorial gold dollar failed to sell many coins to the public at the original issue price of $3, Mehl purchased about 10,000 (half the extant mintage) at just over face value, selling them to the public at less than the issue price well into the 1920s. Mehl similarly acquired (from Zerbe, the coin's promoter) thousands of the Louisiana Purchase Exposition dollars and sold them to his customers. In late 1919, Mehl stated that he had an advertising budget of $5,000 per year, and he continued to advertise in non-numismatic publications, spending $200 (equivalent to $3,714 in 2025) on a single insertion of an advertisement in The American Boy.

== Middle years (1920–1940) ==
During the Great Depression, the Fort Worth, Tex., dealer B. Max Mehl carried on a years-long newspaper advertising campaign (which he later admitted had cost him over a million 1930s dollars!), offering to buy for $50 apiece any 1913 Liberty head nickels offered. This offer was not bona-fide, being merely a come-on to promote sales of his Star Rare Coin Encyclopedia, which went through over 30 editions despite being of no numismatic value. The major effect of Mehl's publicity was threefold: It made Mehl very wealthy through peddling his worthless book; it made the 1913 Liberty head nickel one of the most famous of American coins; and it stimulated the ungodly to make thousands of altered dates (mostly from 1903, 1910 or 1912) pretending to be 1913's.

— Walter H. Breen, Walter Breen's Complete Encyclopedia of U.S. and Colonial Coins (1988), p. 254.

In 1921, Mehl sold his first 1804 dollar, one of the great rarities of American numismatics. He turned the sale to good account in his advertising, noting that he had paid over $2,000 (equivalent to $36,101 in 2025) for an old silver dollar and wondering what rarities the reader might have undiscovered in their possession. The United States Post Office Department found this to be deceptive. Thereafter, Mehl switched campaigns, offering to buy any 1894-S Barber dimes (also extremely scarce) that the reader might have, at a time when common-date Barber dimes were everyday pocket change. During his career, Mehl sold six 1804 dollars, selling two of the six twice. Similarly, Mehl boasted of spending a million dollars advertising in vain to buy a 1913 Liberty Head nickel, knowing that none of these extremely rare coins were to be found in circulation. Though he bought many other coins as a result, his primary purpose was to promote the sale of his catalogue, and his campaign supposedly led to transit delays in some cities as trolley conductors checked through their change. His actual purchase, for $200, of a rare cent, was also advertised.

In his advertisements, Mehl urged collectors to sign up for his "Mehl-ing list". According to a 1929 article on Mehl, he was among the top five recipients of mail in Fort Worth, and during the busier part of the year, ranked second or third, though another source states he accounted for more than half of Fort Worth's incoming mail, leading the post office to put additional trucks on the Magnolia Avenue route. Despite his extensive dealings in coins, the 1929 article disclosed he did not himself collect them, feeling that he could not both collect and deal in coins; instead, he collected autographs. Both his auctions and his fixed-price coin sales were by mail-order only; if a prospective buyer showed up in Fort Worth, Mehl would discuss a purchase and even take the person to dinner, but would insist his guest return home and write to complete the purchase, stating he did not want anyone to feel under pressure to buy. From 1924 to 1926, Mehl served on the ANA's board of governors.

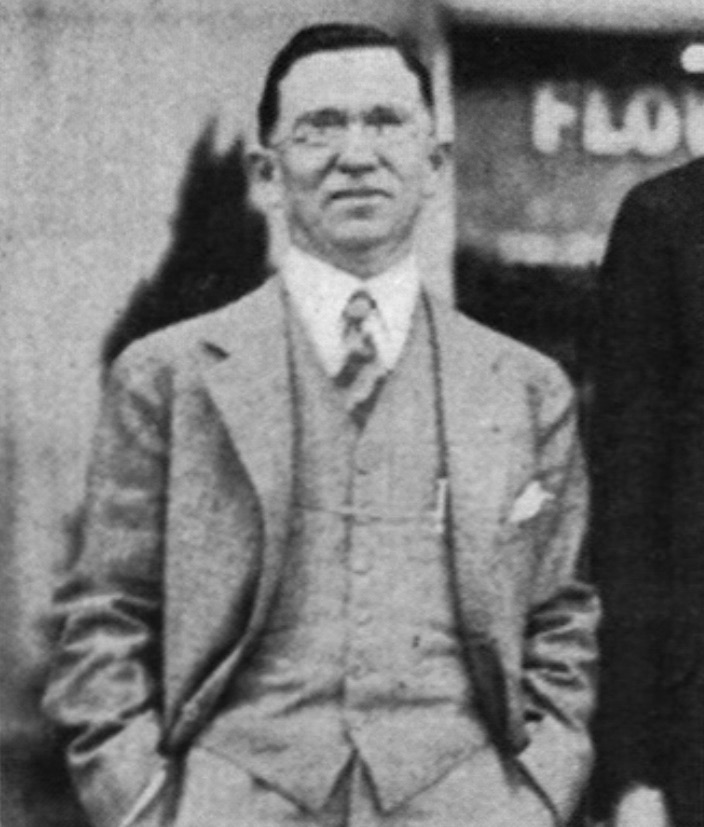
Mehl in 1931

In the early 1930s, amid the Great Depression, hobbies prospered, including coin collecting. Mehl greatly expanded his campaign to sell coin books to the American public, who were receptive, liking the idea of finding a rare coin in those difficult times that might solve one's financial worries. Mehl purchased full-page advertisements in Sunday newspapers and had his own nationwide radio program, stating in 1933 that he had spent more than $50,000 (equivalent to $1,243,573 in 2025) to advertise on more than 50 radio stations. A 1931 advertisement in The American Weekly, a Sunday newspaper supplement, cost him $18,500, while a $2,000 ad in The Saturday Evening Post brought in 9,800 book orders during the first week. Catering to both beginning and advanced collectors, Mehl worked for years to get the noted numismatist, Colonel E.H.R. Green, who made large coin purchases, as a customer; he was eventually successful and sold Green an estimated $500,000 worth of coins. His incoming mail peaked with 1.25 million pieces in 1935. Mehl proclaimed, in 1938, that he had $250,000 in capital, $500,000 in resources and “the largest numismatic establishment in the United States". In 1939, Mehl employed 50 people, and boasted that he had more people on his payroll than all other U.S. coin dealers combined.

During the commemorative coin boom of the 1930s, Mehl continued to push them, noting that they had gone up in value during the Depression years even as stocks sank. When representatives of the Arkansas Centennial Commission came to him in late 1935 after having sold out the year's issue of the Arkansas Centennial half dollar, Mehl advised them to get the Bureau of the Mint to agree to strike limited-edition varieties of the coin that could be resold to the public at high prices. The Mint refused, but did agree to strike more of the original coins, few of which were made available to the public, but were sold by Mehl at a premium above the issue price. In January 1936, with prices still rising for commemorative coins (the bubble burst near the end of the year), Mehl published an advertisement urging collectors to "BUY NOW—Potential $10 and $20 coins for a fraction of their near-future value!" In 1937, Mehl published a booklet on commemorative coins.

== Later years (1940–1957) ==
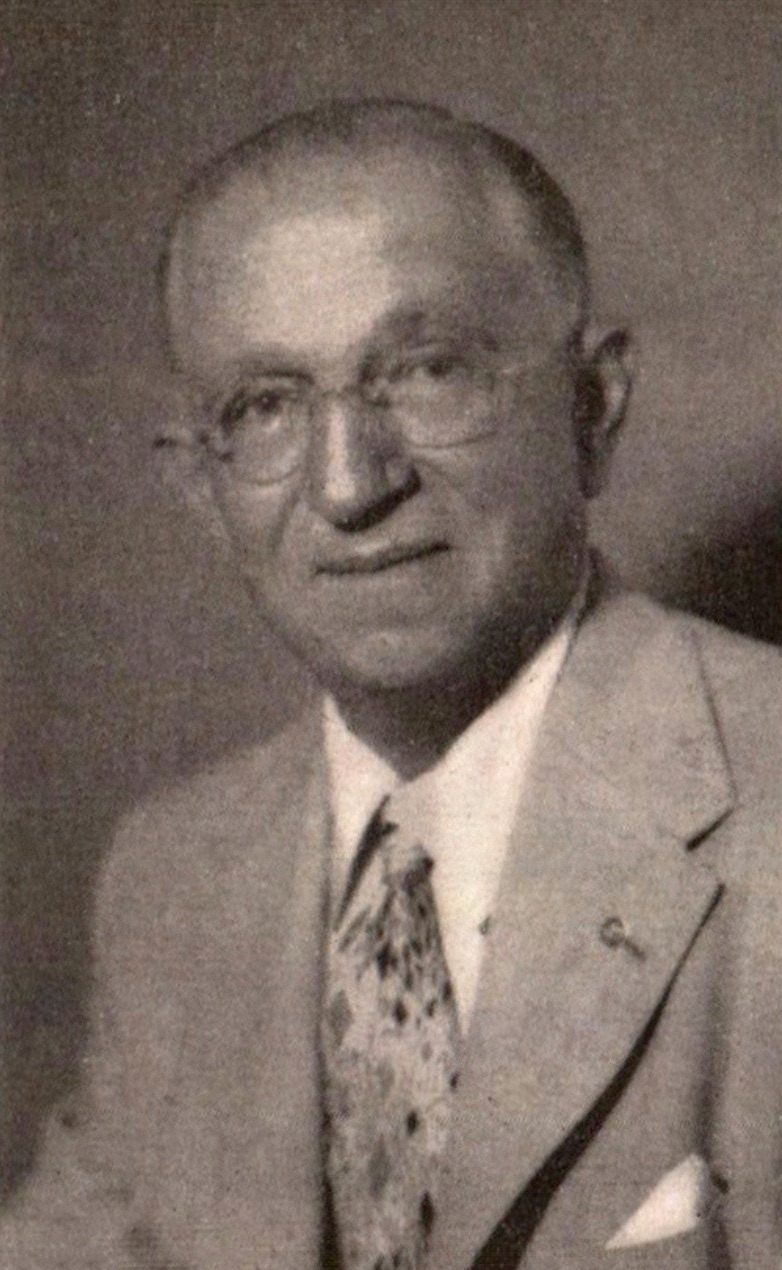
Mehl, c. 1953

According to Bowers, "in the decade of the 1940s, Mehl reached his glory." Mehl had 116 auction sales, all conducted by mail, between 1903 and 1955; those after 1940 included some that Bowers described as "awesome and incredible". Never a researcher, Mehl made exaggerations or errors in his catalogs that led to some criticism of him in the numismatic community.

Among the post-1940 sales were the William Forrester Dunham Sale (1941), Fred E. Olsen (1944, containing the first 1913 Liberty Head nickel Mehl ever handled, despite his advertisements), and the duplicates from the King Farouk collection (1947). The Dunham collection included an 1804 dollar and another great rarity, an 1822 half eagle, and Mehl sold another 1804 dollar in the 1946 William Cutler Atwater sale for a record-breaking price of $10,500. Mehl dubbed the sale of the Farouk coins the "Royal Sale", though only about six percent of the lots in the sale had been owned by Farouk. Unable to gain permission to illustrate the auction catalog cover with a portrait of Farouk, Mehl instead used an Egyptian coin that depicted Farouk, and which required no permission to display. Mehl also handled the auction of the coin collection of composer Jerome Kern (1950). Coin dealer Abe Kosoff wrote in Mehl's 1957 obituary in the pages of The Numismatist, "Max was master of the finesse of cataloging."

During World War II, Mehl was chairman of Fort Worth Draft Board #2. His other civic activities included being president of the Rotary Club and of the Exchange Club. He served as potentate of Moslah Shrine Temple, and sat on the board of the Fort Worth Chamber of Commerce. He was a member of the Fort Worth Club, Colonial Country Club and Temple Beth-El. He received a humanitarian award from the National Conference of Christians and Jews, Fort Worth chapter, in 1956.

By the 1950s, Mehl's numismatic activities were diminishing. After the Kern collection in 1950 (which he styled his "Golden Jubilee" sale), he conducted only three more auctions, the last on October 25, 1955. B. Max Mehl died on September 28, 1957, having had a serious heart condition for some time, and was interred two days later, with Abe Kosoff as one of his pallbearers, in the Beth-El section of Greenwood Cemetery in Fort Worth.

== Aftermath and assessment ==
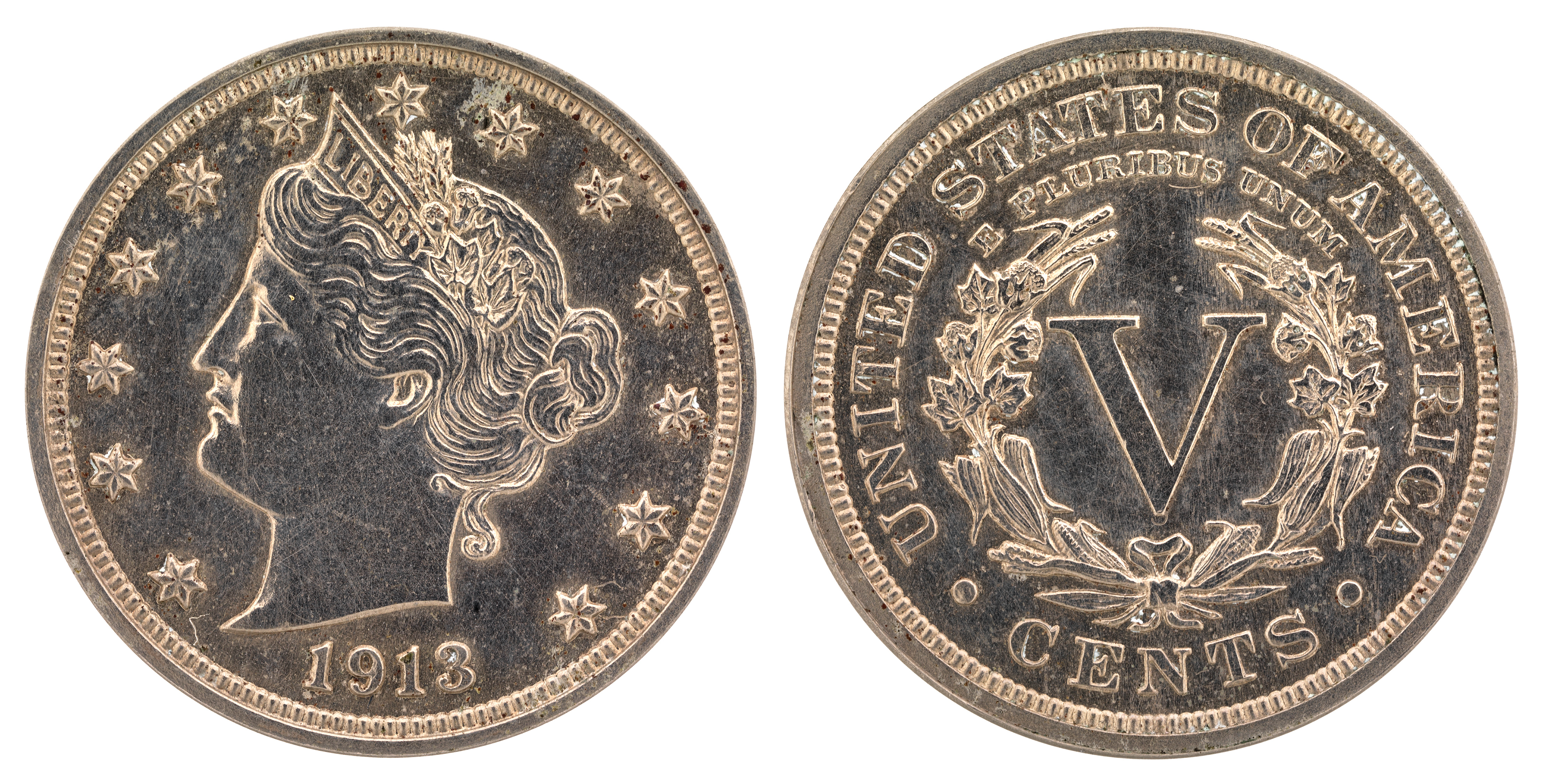
Mehl placed ads to purchase a 1913 Liberty Head nickel (specimen from the National Numismatic Collection)

After Mehl's death, his executive secretary of over 40 years' service, Mary Ellen Ferguson, kept the firm going until her own death in 1961. Thereafter, Kosoff, who managed Mehl's numismatic estate, offered the trade name for sale for $25,000. Kenneth Nichols of Costa Mesa, California bought it, and set up the B. Max Mehl Co. He later sold the firm to George Nichols of Beverly Hills. It continued to run advertisements in The Numismatist until July 1966, thereafter fading from active business.

Bowers described Mehl as "America's most famous rare coin dealer of the first half of the 20th century ... [who] was a promoter of coins and arguably did more to advance the hobby than any other individual of his time". According to numismatist Pete Smith, "Mehl is remembered as one of the great dealers and promoters for the hobby." Daniel C. Parker called Mehl "the father of modern coin collecting ... he more than anyone before or since that time popularized our hobby. He brought it out of the affluent man's domain and made it a hobby for all ages and economic strata."

Many of his contemporaries dubbed Mehl "the P. T. Barnum of numismatics". Tom LaMarre wrote, "Mehl sold more than coins, he sold an image. Ads featured the Mehl building, Mehl standing in front of his luxurious home, or other scenes intended to depict the dealer as a coin tycoon." Charles D. Horning wrote in 1995, "Mehl was truly a phenomenal self-promoter." Parker stated, "Mehl had a fantastic knowledge of human nature. Had he come along 40 or 50 years later, he would have made a fortune on Madison Avenue." Jay Guren, in a 1979 article in Coin World, agreed: "Mehl was a numismatist and much much more. He was a super promoter and comprehended human psychology to a T." Kosoff remembered, "Whatever he did, he did with a flair and a touch of class. It was always the biggest and the best or some other superlative."

ANA life member Walt Southward wrote in a 2004 article on Mehl that the dealer "achiev[ed] the status of hobby icon during the 1920s and '30s, he received numerous accolades, from the ANA and others, as he spent many thousands of dollars promoting the hobby. He was credited with being a tremendous advocate for coin collecting, using newspaper and magazine ads and radio programs to spread the word." Mehl was inducted into the ANA's Numismatic Hall of Fame in 1974, and, in 2010, was part of the six-member inaugural grouping inducted into the CoinFacts Dealer Hall of Fame, established by the Professional Coin Grading Service.

== Sources ==
- "B. Max Mehl". The Numismatist: 89. March 1906.
- "Officers of the A.N.A. for Fifty Years". The Numismatist: 754–759. October 1941.
- Bowers, Q. David (October–December 1983). "A Visit with B. Max Mehl". Rare Coin Review: 12–14.
- Bowers, Q. David (1992). Commemorative Coins of the United States: A Complete Encyclopedia. Bowers and Merena Galleries, Inc. ISBN 978-0-943161-35-8.
- Bowers, Q. David (March–April 1999). "Question & Answer Forum". Rare Coin Review: 81–82.
- Bowers, Q. David (July–August 1999). "B. Max Mehl". Rare Coin Review: 64–70.
- Bowers, Q. David (2016). "A Milestone Celebration, Part I". 125 Years of Collecting With the American Numismatic Association. Archived from the original on November 23, 2021.
- Deisher, Beth (July 2003). "Liberty Head Legends". The Numismatist: 36–43.
- Guren, Jay (September 12, 1979). "Mehl Introduces Many to Numismatic World". Coin World. p. 54.
- Heath, George F. (June 1903). "Applications for Membership". The Numismatist: 182–183.
- Heath, George F. (September 1906). "Disappearance of the Gold Dollars Explained". The Numismatist: 300–302.
- Horning, Charles D. (Winter–Spring 1995). "The Armand Champa Library". The Commemorative Trail: 42–48.
- Kosoff, Abe (November 1957). "B. Max Mehl, A.N.A. Honorary Member, A.N.A. No. 522". The Numismatist: 1304–1305.
- LaMarre, Tom (Spring 1987). "B. Max Mehl: The 1913 Nickel Man". Rare Coin Review: 46–47.
- Lupia, John N. III (2016). "Mehl, Benjamin Maximillian". Encyclopedic Dictionary of Numismatic Biographies. Archived from the original on November 23, 2021.
- Molyneaux, Peter J. (March 1929). "A Texas Master of Coins". The Numismatist: 176–188.
- Parker, Daniel C. (Winter 1978). "The Dean of American Numismatics". The Centinel: 9–11.
- Smith, Pete (April 1997). "Mehl 'Library' Offered in April Sale". The Numismatist: 407–409.
- Smith, Pete (February 3, 2016). "Numismatic History – Coin Dealer B. Max Mehl – a Texas Master of Coins". CoinWeek. Archived from the original on November 23, 2021.
- Southward, Walt (March 2004). "B. Max Mehl: Numismatic Entrepreneur Extraordinaire". The Numismatist: 59–61.
- Swiatek, Anthony (2012). Encyclopedia of the Commemorative Coins of the United States. KWS Publishers. ISBN 978-0-9817736-7-4.
- Weiner, Hollace Ava. "Mehl, Benjamin Maximillian (1884–1957)". Handbook of Texas. Archived from the original on November 23, 2021.
- Weiner, Hollace Ava (April 17, 2021). "This Fort Worth Marketing Whiz Turned Coin Collecting into a Mainstream Hobby". Fort Worth Star-Telegram. Archived from the original on April 28, 2021.
- Zerbe, Farran (August 1906). "A Jaunt Across the Continent". The Numismatist: 261–277.
