= Gene Hessler =

- Born: Eugene Joseph Hessler; July 13, 1928 (age 98); Mount Healthy, Ohio, U.S.
- Occupations: Numismatist, author
- Years active: 1951-present

Eugene Joseph "Gene" Hessler (born July 13, 1928) is an American musician and numismatist, specialising in paper money.

== Biography ==
Hessler was born in Mount Healthy, Ohio, in 1928. After studying music in Cincinnati, he traveled as a trombonist with the bands of Elliot Lawrence, Woody Herman, Billy May, and others. He moved to NYC in 1955 and received a master's degree from the Manhattan School of Music in 1957. Hessler remained in NYC for over 30 years performing in the Broadway pit orchestras for The Music Man, Camelot, How to Succeed in Business, Annie and many other musicals. He also worked at the Radio City Music Hall and as a freelance trombonist, performing or recording with Doc Severinsen, Tommy Newsom, Urbie Green, and many more New York musicians. In and around New York City, Hessler worked with the bands of Buddy Rich, Sauter-Finegan, and Richard Maltby.

He also performed as an extra or substitute with the New York Philharmonic and the Metropolitan Opera Orchestra under numerous conductors including Leonard Bernstein and Leopold Stokowski. He traveled through Africa with a musical group in 1964 and went around the world with the Cincinnati Symphony Orchestra in 1966; both were State Department tours. During his time on Broadway, Hessler became a serious numismatist under the mentorship of Lester Merkin, a musician and numismatic dealer.

== Numismatic career ==
He has published five books related to the history and the engravers of paper money, and has written for numerous magazines and journals, including the International Bank Note Society Journal, The Numismatist, Coin World, and was editor of Paper Money for fourteen years (1984-1998). He discovered and published several previously unknown designs for U.S. currency through research at the Bureau of Engraving and Printing and the Smithsonian Institution. He was curator of the Chase Manhattan Bank Money Museum (1967-1975, while he continued working as a musician), and the St. Louis Mercantile Bank Money Museum (1986-1989). He is also known for his correspondence with numismatist Eric P. Newman.

Membership of specialist societies
Hessler is a member of the American Numismatic Association (since 1967); the American Numismatic Society (elected Fellow c.1973); the Cincinnati Numismatic Association (board member 2005–present); the Essay Proof Society (vice president 1987-1993, director 1987-93); the International Bank Note Society (director in the 1980s); and Society of Paper Money Collectors (board member 1987-2001).

== Awards and honours ==
- 1983 ANA Heath Literary Award
- 1990 ANA Honorary Life Member
- 1991 Howland Wood Memorial Award for Best-of-Show Exhibit (for his exhibit of the complete works of Czech banknote designer Max Svabinsky)
- 1993 ANA Glen Smedley Memorial Award
- 1994 Professional Numismatists Guild Outstanding Achievement Award
- 1995 ANA Medal of Merit
- 1998 ANA Presidential Award
- 2001 International Bank Note Society Silver Medal for Service
- 2001 Middle Atlantic Numismatic Association Numismatist of the Year
- 2007 Numismatic Literary Guild Clemy
- 2014 American Numismatic Association's Lifetime Achievement Award
- 2014 Society of Paper Money Collectors Hall of Fame

Membership of specialist societies
Hessler is a member of the American Numismatic Association (since 1967); the American Numismatic Society (elected Fellow c.1973); the Cincinnati Numismatic Association (board member 2005–present); the Essay Proof Society (vice president 1987-1993, director 1987-93); the International Bank Note Society (director in the 1980s); and Society of Paper Money Collectors (board member 1987-2001).

== Selected publications ==
- 1974: The Comprehensive Catalog of US Paper Money
- 1977: The Comprehensive Catalog of US Paper Money (revised edition)
- 1979: U.S. Essay, Proof, and Specimen Notes (revised in 2004)
- 1988: An Illustrated History of U.S. Loans, 1775-1898
- 1993 The Engraver's Line: An Encyclopedia of Paper Money & Postage Stamp Art
- 2005 The International Engraver's Line: Paper Money and Postage Stamp Engravers and Their Work from the 1700s to the Euro
- 2009 Hey! Mister Horn Blower: Memoirs of a Life in Music and Numismatics
