= Chase Manhattan Bank Money Museum =

Museum in New York City (1928–1977)

Coordinates: 40.758°N 73.978°W

The Chase Manhattan Bank Money Museum was a money museum in New York City from 1928 to 1977.

== History ==
The core of the collection was acquired by the Chase National Bank from numismatist Farran Zerbe in 1928, who became the first curator of the new museum, and contained legal tender in a variety of forms, including wampum, ancient and modern coins, and paper money. Among the popular exhibits were a rare 1804 Silver Dollar, a check written on a silk parachute, another written on metal and canceled with a submachine gun, as well as the original check for $8,500,000 signed by John D. Rockefeller Jr. to pay for the site of the United Nations headquarters in New York City. Also notable was a piece of the large circular stone money from the Pacific Island of Yap. The museum prepared, from its collections, a series of traveling exhibits that were sent to the many branches of the bank in New York, and did much to popularize the hobby of coin collecting in the 1950s and 1960s.

In 1939, Zerbe retired and Vernon L. Brown became the curator of the museum. After several moves, the museum opened at Rockefeller Center on Sixth Avenue in Manhattan, New York City, on July 10, 1956, on the ground floor of the RCA Building. After Vernon Brown left the museum in 1963, Francesco Cantarella succeeded him until Don Taxay was appointed curator in April 1964. Taxay wrote a number of highly regarded numismatic reference works, but mysteriously disappeared in the 1970s. David Nolan, who went on to become a well-known author and historian, worked at the museum in the summer of 1963 as acting assistant curator. In 1968 the museum got its first woman director, Helen V. Foote, who served into the 1970s.

The museum closed in 1977 and most of the collection (approximately 26,000 objects) was donated to the National Numismatic Collection at the Smithsonian Institution on January 16, 1978. Only the tiniest fraction of it has ever been on display there. Some of the collection went to the American Numismatic Society, including an 1804 U.S. dollar. An 1862 $1 Legal Tender note with Serial Number 1 (the first dollar bill issued by the United States) is now in the Chase Bank.

Gene Hessler was the last curator of the museum, serving from 1967 to 1975.
