= Don Taxay =

American historian

- Taxay in 1975
- Born: Donald Paul Taxay; May 24, 1933; Chicago, Illinois, U.S.
- Disappeared: c. 1982 (aged 49); India
- Occupations: Numismatist; historian

Donald Paul Taxay (born May 24, 1933) was an American numismatist and historian, known for the reference works he composed and for his disappearance at the height of his career.

== Career in numismatics ==
Taxay's first published work was Counterfeit, Mis-Struck and Unofficial U.S. Coins, in 1963, followed by The U.S. Mint and Coinage in 1966 (which Gilroy Roberts called "the most complete and authoritative treatise on the subject ever written"), An Illustrated History of U.S. Commemorative Coinage in 1967, Money of the American Indians in 1970, and Scott's Comprehensive Catalogue and Encyclopedia of United States Coins in 1971. He also served as the curator of the Chase Manhattan Bank Money Museum from April 1964 to May 1966.

=== Business career ===
His first numismatic job was as manager of the leased coin department at the Jordan Marsh department store in Boston, joining the firm in 1958. He followed this with stints as the manager of Royal Athena Coin Galleries in New York City, and New Netherlands Coin Company, where he worked with renowned numismatists and researchers John J. Ford and Walter Breen. In 1963, Breen and Taxay formed the Institute of Numismatic Authenticators.

In 1969, he and William Thomas Anton Jr. co-authored catalogs for Harmer Rooke. In 1974, he joined award-winning numismatist Harry Forman in establishing the coin dealership of Forman, Taxay and Associates. In 1975, Taxay was appointed senior vice president of First Coinventors, Inc. where he also served as director of their Colonial American Coin Club. On July 8, 1976, he formed Rare Coin Collectors Co-op, Inc., which operated until December 30, 1977. In approximately 1977, Taxay withdrew from society.

== Personal life ==
On December 25, 1977, Taxay married Constance "Connie" Ferris. The marriage ended in divorce on April 12, 1982. Taxay was a resident of Lakeland, Florida, by 1979.

== Disappearance ==
In 2005–2006, the members of the Numismatic Bibliomania Society's mailing list undertook a joint research project to discover what had happened to Taxay. They established that Taxay had been introduced to Indian spirituality by Walter Breen and that, as a result, Taxay became a Rajneeshee and emigrated to India. Historian Karl Moulton—whose 2007 book Henry Voigt and Others Involved in America's Early Coinage includes a chapter analyzing Taxay's historiography—speculated that Taxay attempted to liquidate all his property so that he could donate his wealth to the Bhagwan Shree Rajneesh and describes him as "brainwashed and untraceable," concluding that Taxay's ultimate fate may never be known.

== See also ==
- List of people who disappeared mysteriously (1980s)
