= Lester Merkin =

American jazz saxophonist and numismatist

Lester Merkin (March 17, 1916–July 26, 1992) was an American jazz saxophonist and mid‑20th‑century numismatist. He performed with major big-band leaders, including Paul Whiteman and Gene Krupa, and contributed to several studio and ensemble recordings during the 1930s and 1940s. After leaving full‑time music, Merkin became one of New York's most respected rare‑coin dealers and auctioneers, noted for his innovative catalog design, his handling of significant collections, and his correspondence with leading researchers such as Eric P. Newman. His auction catalogs and research collaborations remain valued references in American numismatics.

== Early life ==
Merkin was born in Philadelphia in 1916 to Russian immigrant parents. He later moved to New York City, where he and his wife Selma participated actively in the city's arts and antiques circles. He attended Temple University and served in the United States Navy during World War II.

== Musical career ==
Merkin trained as a professional reed player and became known as a saxophonist of “outstanding talent.” He performed with several major jazz and dance‑band ensembles, including those led by Whiteman and Krupa. His documented recording credits include performances on alto saxophone, baritone saxophone, and clarinet.

=== Sessionography ===
The following entries summarize Merkin's verifiable studio and ensemble appearances as documented in commercial releases and discographic databases:

- Claude Thornhill Orchestra – studio recordings (alto saxophone, clarinet), various sessions later reissued on compilation albums.
- Studio dance‑band ensembles (New York) – reed‑section contributions on 1930s–40s sides included in retrospective jazz anthologies.
- Uncredited big‑band sessions – Merkin appears in reed‑section personnel on several period recordings attributed to studio orchestras active in New York during the late swing era.

=== Selected recordings ===
- Compilation appearances featuring performances with Claude Thornhill (alto saxophone, clarinet).
- Anthologies of 1930s–40s American jazz including Merkin in reed‑section roles.

== Numismatic career ==
Merkin entered the rare‑coin trade in 1958 and quickly established himself as a leading professional numismatist. In 1961 he incorporated his firm, Lester Merkin Coins, Inc., operating from a storefront on Madison Avenue near the Drake Hotel.

From 1956 to late 1976 he conducted 32 major auction sales, most of them cataloged by researcher Walter Breen. His August 14, 1964 sale of the Lou Helfenstein collection introduced the first full‑color cover used in a major American coin‑auction catalog, a design that became widely influential.

Merkin handled several landmark consignments, including the Alfred J. Ostheimer III collection of silver dollars (1968) and, in 1979, the sale of the King of Siam presentation set on behalf of David J. Spink.

=== Archival materials and correspondence ===
Merkin maintained correspondence with leading numismatic scholars, including Eric P. Newman. A 1968 letter preserved in the Newman Numismatic Portal documents Merkin's involvement in research on an 1854 “G. Blake Assayer” gold bar, demonstrating his participation in high‑level authentication and historical inquiry.

== Later life and death ==
In the 1980s Merkin experienced significant medical difficulties affecting his eyesight and mobility, though he remained active in the numismatic community and continued to receive visits from colleagues and clients. His reference library was auctioned by George F. Kolbe in 1984. He died in New York City on July 26, 1992. In 2013 he was inducted into the PCGS CoinFacts Coin Dealer Hall of Fame.

== Legacy ==
Merkin is remembered as an ethical and influential figure in American numismatics, praised by contemporaries for his professionalism and generosity. His auction catalogs remain valued references for collectors and researchers, and his early musical career places him among the many jazz musicians who transitioned into other artistic and commercial fields in mid‑century New York.

== Bibliography and further reading ==
- Breen, Walter. Auction Catalogs of Lester Merkin Coins, Inc. Various dates, 1964–1979.
- Kolbe, George F. Auction Sale of the Library of Lester Merkin. George Frederick Kolbe, 1984.
- Newman, Eric P. Correspondence with Lester Merkin, 1968. Newman Numismatic Portal.
- Bowers, Q. David. American Coin Dealers and Auctioneers of the 20th Century. Whitman Publishing.
- Thornhill, Claude. Complete Studio Recordings. Compilation releases featuring Merkin's reed‑section performances.
