= National Numismatic Collection =

National coin cabinet of the United States

The National Numismatic Collection is the national coin cabinet of the United States. The collection is part of the Smithsonian Institution's National Museum of American History.

== Overview ==
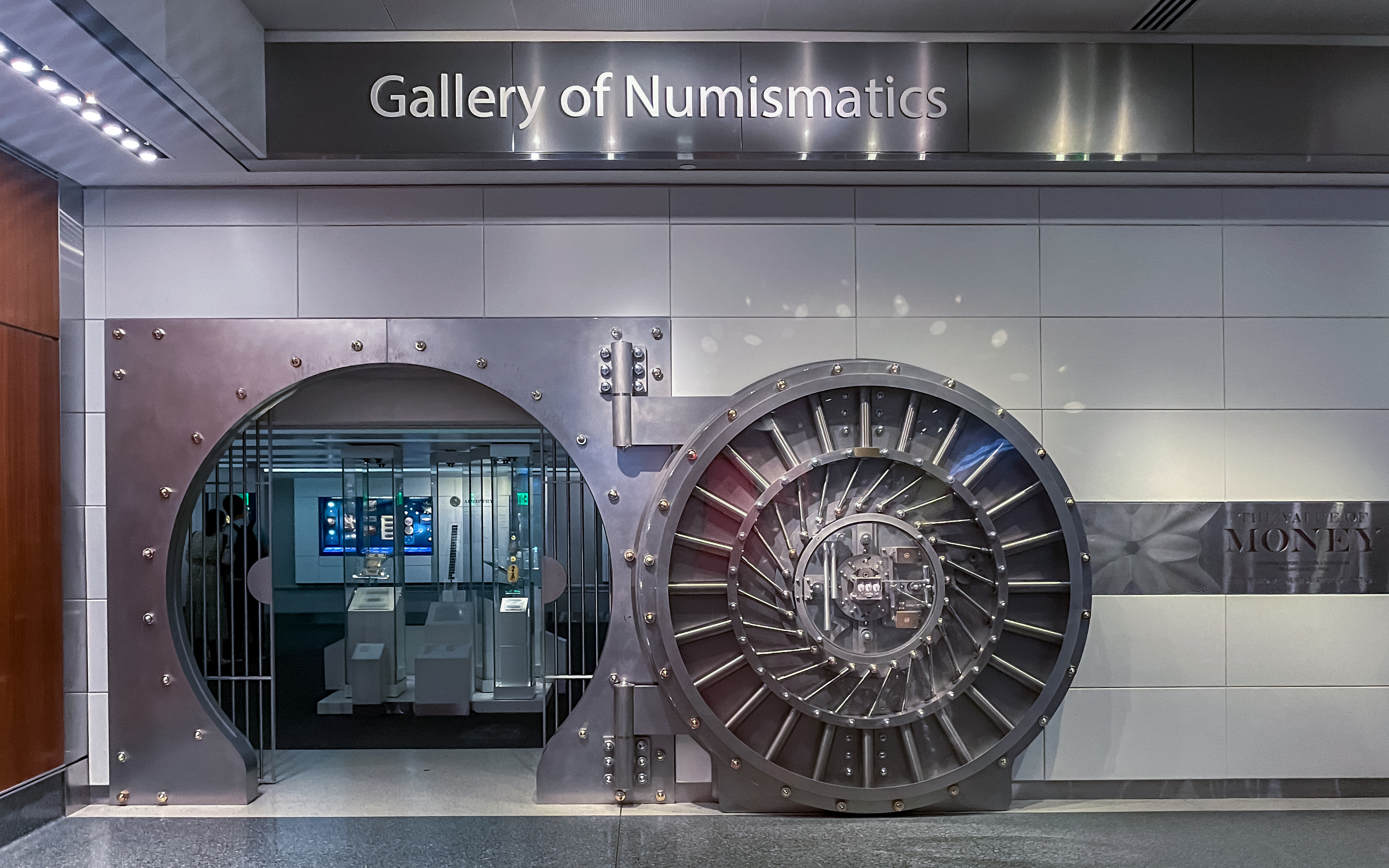
The Gallery of Numismatics in the National Museum of American History, Washington, D.C.

The National Numismatic Collection comprises approximately 1.6 million objects. It is one of the world's largest and most diverse collections of coins, paper currency, medals, commodity currencies, financial instruments, exonumia, and related items. As the collection of record for the U.S. monetary system, it holds the collections of the U.S. Mint, Treasury, and Bureau of Engraving and Printing. In addition, it includes collections donated by individual collectors and private institutions, such as the collection of the Chase Manhattan Bank Money Museum.

== History ==
Until 2004, the exhibit housing the Collection was the last surviving exhibit from the Smithsonian Institution's National Museum of American History's original 1964 arrangement. In late 2004, the exhibit was closed, and the objects were returned to the Smithsonian's vaults. In 2015, the museum opened a new permanent Gallery of Numismatics with an exhibition titled The Value of Money.

== Noteworthy items in the collection ==
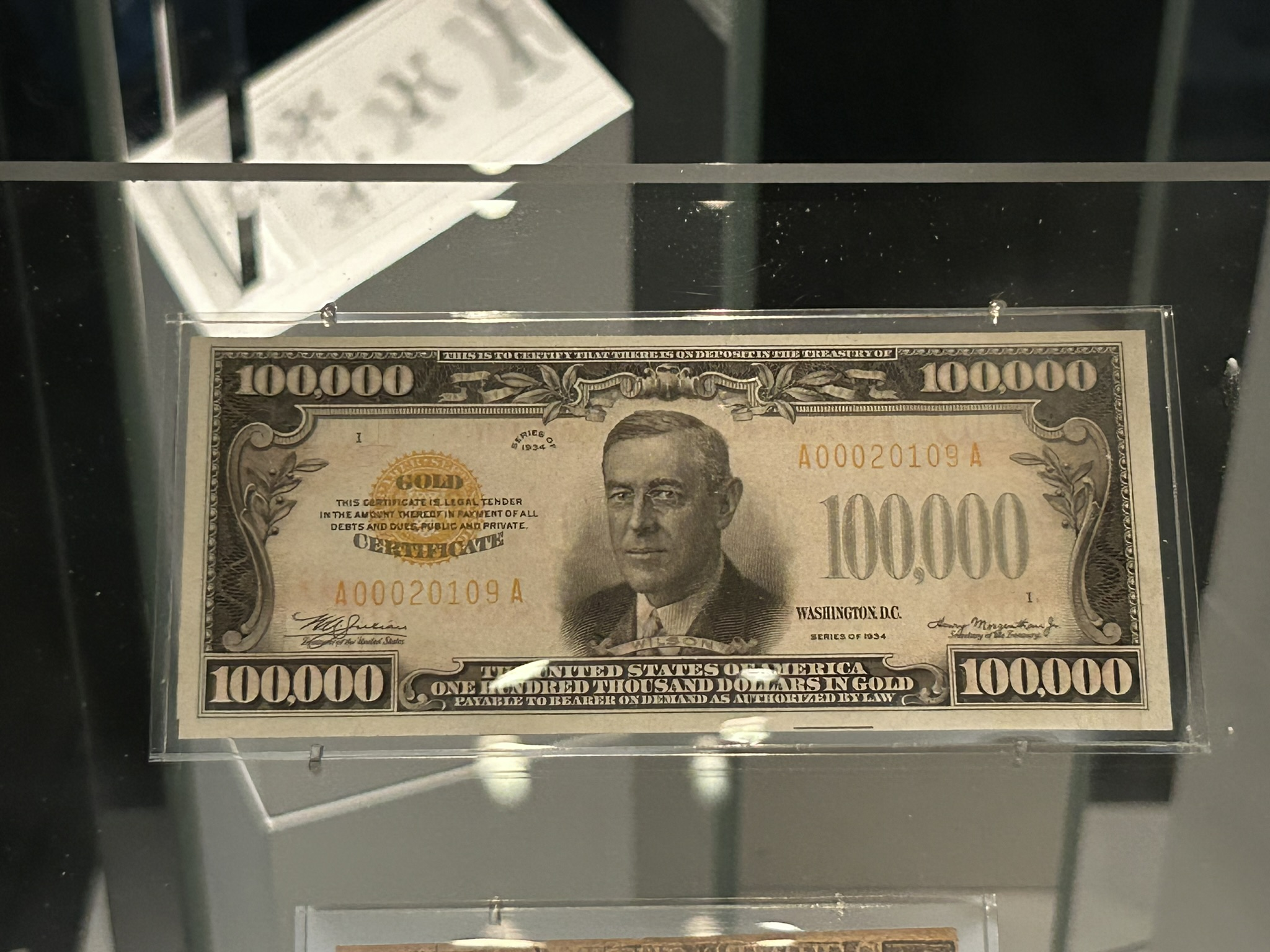
A $100,000 gold certificate from the National Numismatic Collection

- A gold 20 Excelentes coin of Ferdinand and Isabella of Spain
- Brasher half doubloon
- All three types of the 1804 dollar
- The 1849 double eagle
- The two gold 1877 half unions
- All nine 1909–1910 Washington nickels
- One 1913 Liberty Head nickel
- Two 1933 double eagles
- The 1974 aluminum cent
- The only known 1928 $5000 gold certificate, serial number A00000001A (the note has a repaired tear)
- The only known 1928 $10,000 gold certificate, serial number A00000001A
- An example of a $100,000 gold certificate, the largest denomination of banknote ever produced in the US

== See also ==
- Alaskan parchment scrip
- Art and engraving on United States banknotes
- Early American currency
- Federal Reserve Bank Note
- Federal Reserve Note (Series 1914 and 1918)
- Fractional currency
- Gold certificate (United States)
- Greenback (1860s money)
- Historical armorial of U.S. states from 1876
- Interest bearing note
- Large denominations of United States currency
- Silver certificate (United States)
- Treasury Note (1890–1891)
