= CoinWeek =

American numismatics publication

- Website type: News, Education & Analysis
- Available in: English
- Headquarters: Silver Springs, FL
- Owner: CoinWeek
- Editor: Scott Purvis
- Key people: Scott Purvis (publisher)
- Website: coinweek.com
- Commercial: Yes
- Launched: 2011
- Current status: active

CoinWeek is an American internet-based publication that publishes articles, analysis, news, videos and podcasts about a wide range of numismatic topics. It is one of the leading online publications for coin collectors in the North American market, winning more than two-dozen Numismatic Literary Guild (NLG) Awards since its launch in 2011.

== Founding and early history (2010–2014) ==
Work began on CoinWeek in 2010 as an evolution of the website CoinLink, founded by Scott Purvis in 1995. CoinLink was one of the Internet's first numismatic resources that connected coin dealers to collectors, presenting collectors with lists and profiles of many of the rare coin industry's leading dealers. As the site evolved, it began to aggregate press releases and news articles from the industry's leading companies and offer collectors original news and editorial content—such as articles by numismatic blogger Greg Reynolds, among others.

In 2009, Purvis conceptualized a new website that would serve as a free daily online coin magazine. He formed a creative partnership with videographer David Lisot. Lisot had previously operated a numismatic video production service called CoinTelevision. With CoinWeek, Lisot travelled the country, providing short video segments for the website while continuing to produce full-length videos for CoinTelevision. Purvis managed the website and, over time, hired a team of editorial writers that included Al Doyle, Greg, Reynolds, Louis Golino, Charles Morgan and Hubert Walker.

CoinWeek grew rapidly and soon won a Numismatic Literary Guild Award for Best Online Coin Website. CoinWeek’s writers and videographer David Lisot were honored by the NLG for their contributions as well.

== The Expansion and Transition (2014–2025) ==
Scott Purvis sought to expand the scope of CoinWeek in 2014. Purvis envisioned a site that would be a head-to-head competitor to the hobby’s leading print publications. He promoted writer Charles Morgan to Content Manager in February 2014, and then again to Editor in July of that year. Purvis shifted his focus to site development and optimization to stay on the cutting edge of site performance, SEO, and Google Search's transition to an AI Platform.

Purvis and Morgan saw the need to transform CoinWeek into a more collector-friendly site focused on education, analysis, and the aspirational aspects of coin collecting. They widened 'CoinWeek’s focus to cover ancient coins (bringing author Mike Markowitz on board for a bi-weekly series), world coins, modern coins, and the cultural and economic aspects of numismatic history. Morgan also rejuvenated CoinWeek’s multi-media offerings, including a YouTube channel.

Also in 2015, CoinWeek expanded its coverage with a new emphasis on Ancient Coins, World Coins, and created a platform for all collectors to participate. This included the Weekly CoinWeek Coin Giveaway. As a result, CoinWeek visitor engagement jumped fivefold.

Starting in 2022, CoinWeek began to publish narrative versions of original research notes in a series titled "CoinWeek Notes."

At the end of October 2025, Charles Morgan departed CoinWeek to take an opportunity as a lead researcher, manager, and writer position at PCGS. In November, Scott Purvis retook control of CoinWeek's Website, marketing, editorial direction, and day-to-day operations.
