= Rhode Island Tercentenary half dollar =

1936 commemorative U.S. coin

- United States
- Value: 50 cents (0.50 US dollars)
- Mass: 12.5 g
- Diameter: 30.61 mm (1.20 in)
- Thickness: 2.15 mm (0.08 in)
- Edge: Reeded
- Composition: 90.0% silver; 10.0% copper
- Silver: 0.36169 troy oz
- Years of minting: 1936
- Mintage: Philadelphia: 20,013 including 13 pieces for the Assay Commission Denver: 15,010 including 10 assay coins San Francisco: 15,011 including 11 assay coins
- Mint marks: D, S. Beneath the corn stalk on the left-hand side of the obverse. Philadelphia Mint pieces struck without mint mark

Obverse
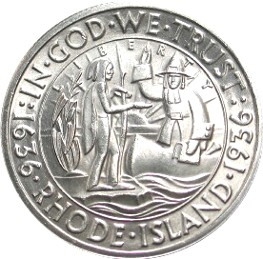
- Design: Roger Williams meeting a Native American
- Designer: John Howard Benson and Arthur Graham Carey
- Design date: 1936

Reverse
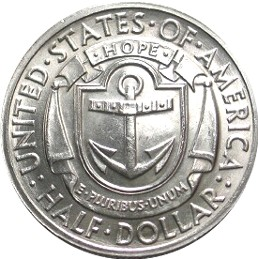
- Design: Anchor; adaptation of the Seal of Rhode Island
- Designer: John Howard Benson and Arthur Graham Carey
- Design date: 1936

The Rhode Island Tercentenary half dollar (sometimes called the Providence, Rhode Island, Tercentenary half dollar) is a commemorative fifty-cent piece struck by the United States Bureau of the Mint in 1936. The coin was designed by John Howard Benson and Arthur Graham Carey. Its obverse depicts Roger Williams, founder of the Colony of Rhode Island and Providence Plantations. It was intended to honor the 300th anniversary of Providence, Rhode Island, although it bears no mention of the city.

Members of Rhode Island's congressional delegation sought a coin for the 300th anniversary of Providence, and Senator Jesse Metcalf added authorization for one to a bill for another commemorative coin that had already passed the United States House of Representatives. The amended bill was approved by both houses of Congress, and it was signed by President Franklin D. Roosevelt. A total of 50,000 coins were struck at the three mints then in operation.

The coins went on sale on March 5, 1936, and the quantity made available to the public sold out in a matter of hours. Rhode Island insiders were holding back quantities for later sale once prices rose. That conduct incensed coin collectors, and the abuses led Congress to move toward banning commemorative coins. The coins are listed for hundreds of dollars today, depending on condition.

== Background and legislation ==
Roger Williams was born in Britain around 1603. He was ordained as a minister, became a Puritan, and moved to the Massachusetts Bay Colony where he became the minister of the church in Salem, Massachusetts. Colonial authorities began to take issue with some of the teachings that he imparted to his congregation, such as the separation of church and state and fair dealings when purchasing land from American Indians. He was banished from the colony in 1635, and attempts were made to send him back to Europe. Instead, he escaped on foot and found refuge with Massasoit, sachem of the Narragansett people. He bought a parcel of land from Massasoit in 1636 and established Providence Plantations. Providence Plantations eventually merged with settlements on Rhode Island to form the Colony of Rhode Island and Providence Plantations, which became the State of Rhode Island.

A committee was established in 1931 to mark the tercentenary of Williams' founding of Providence. Anthony Swiatek and Walter Breen claim in their volume on commemoratives that the moving forces behind the Rhode Island Tercentenary half dollar were Senators Jesse H. Metcalf and Peter Gerry and Representative John Matthew O'Connell, all of whom applied political pressure to authorize the coin. In 1936, commemorative coins were not sold by the government. Congress usually designated an organization which had the exclusive right to purchase them at face value from the United States Mint and sell them to the public at a premium, and the Providence Tercentenary Commission was chartered for the Tercentenary coin.

A bill had passed the House of Representatives on April 3, 1935, for a Hudson Sesquicentennial half dollar, and it had been recommended for passage in the Senate by the Committee on Banking and Currency. When the bill was considered in the Senate on April 15, Senator Metcalf moved to amend it to provide for a Providence Tercentenary half dollar to be issued, as well. There was no objection or debate, and the bill passed the Senate. It was then returned to the House of Representatives which agreed to the Senate amendments, and it was enacted on May 2 by the signature of President Franklin D. Roosevelt.

== Preparation ==
John Howard Benson was one of the artists who designed the coin, and he wrote a letter to Lee Lawrie of the Commission of Fine Arts on December 12, 1935 which provides information on the design process. Benson related that Royal B. Farnum of the Rhode Island School of Design had assigned the coin design to him and Arthur Graham Carey because they had cut dies for small medals.

The Tercentenary Commission's coin committee originally proposed seven stars from an early version of Providence's seal for one side of the new coin, with the anchor from Rhode Island's seal and the state motto "Hope" on the other. Benson told Lawrie that the committee had then changed its mind, wanting to picture Roger Williams on the obverse side being greeted by Narragansetts, and they decided to open the design to a public competition. Benson and Carey persevered, made the changes, and entered the competition—and they were selected.

The Providence artist wrote that he was anxious to receive the opinion of the Fine Arts Commission. Lawrie forwarded the letter to Commission chairman Charles Moore the same day, noting: "I don't know just what his troubles are. ... It won't make a great coin but the models are I think equal to some others we approved." The full Commission approved the designs on December 20, and reductions were made from plaster models to coin-sized hubs were by the Medallic Art Company of New York.

== Design ==
The obverse is based on the seal of Providence showing Roger Williams kneeling in a canoe, his hand raised in signal of friendship. The Narragansett Indian who greets him has his hand extended, palm down, meant as a native sign for "good". Behind the Narragansett is a stalk of corn as a reference to the help and friendship which the Indians had shown to the Mayflower Pilgrims in establishing Plymouth Colony. The Bible in Williams' other hand symbolizes the colonists' contribution to America. The Sun is rising in the background, symbolic of Rhode Island being the first colony where religious liberty was guaranteed. LIBERTY is the theme of the design and appears over their heads. IN GOD WE TRUST, RHODE ISLAND, and the tercentenary dates surround the scene.

The reverse depicts the Anchor of Hope, taken from Rhode Island's state seal. The motto HOPE symbolizes the authority of the state government, while E PLURIBUS UNUM evokes that of the federal government, as it is a national motto. The name of the country and the coin's denomination surround the reverse design.

Nowhere on the coin is the name of Providence, which was left off in the final alterations required by the Coin Committee. According to Swiatek, "this issue's obverse does not rate very high among collectors. The image of Roger Williams has the look of a robot from the old Flash Gordon serial." The two designers later became partners in a stonecutting firm in Newport, Rhode Island, which accounts for the sculptural look of the coin, according to Swiatek. According to Q. David Bowers, "no significant criticisms were ever mounted of the design". Art historian Cornelius Vermeule writes that the bands of lettering overwhelm the designs. "Roger Williams in his canoe looks like Elpenor amid the bulrushes on a Greek vase of about 440 B.C. with a scene of the dialogue of Orpheus in the Underworld." He notes that "the Indian and Williams are blocked out with a childlike charm of conceptualism", but "the coat-of-arms is so simple as to defy analysis, or even comment."

== Production, distribution, and collecting ==
The purpose of this bill is to stop a racket in the issuance of commemorative coins that has developed in recent years. ... Then in April it was announced [that the Providence coins] had sold out in 6 hours. The astonishing part of it is in the entire State of Rhode Island there were only five members of the American Numismatic Association, which is the largest organization of coin collectors in the United States. Where did all the coins go? This Providence dealer immediately raised his price to $7.50 a set, and the next month raised it to $9. He admitted securing 11,500 for orders that he had, then later offered 50 sets to trade and 25 to sell. ... Here is what happened to the collectors. The commission accepted their money. Then, after all were sold, sent most collectors back their money, saying that they had sold them all to natives, but the money sent back was not the original money orders and checks sent in, but checks from the commission. ... Was the coin collectors' money used to send to the mint to get the coins?

— Congressman John J. Cochran, committee report "Prohibiting Issuance and Coinage of Certain Commemorative Coins", July 28, 1937, pages 1, 8

A total of 20,000 half dollars arrived in Providence from the Philadelphia Mint by February 20, 1936; an additional 15,000 each were expected from the Denver and San Francisco Mints, but they had not been received. Those coins had been struck in January (Philadelphia and Denver) and February (San Francisco) 1936. In addition to the quantities sent to Providence, 13 pieces from Philadelphia, 10 from Denver, and 11 from San Francisco were held at Philadelphia for inspection and testing at the 1937 meeting of the United States Assay Commission.

Swiatek and Breen noted, "March 5 proved to be a day of immense noise and confusion". The new coins went on sale through various Rhode Island banks amid considerable publicity at $1 per coin, with the Rhode Island Hospital National Bank taking the lead as depository. Out-of-staters could write to Grant's Hobby Shop in Providence, owned by Horace M. Grant, a well-known numismatist. Within hours of the coins going on sale, banks were allegedly out of them, and the issue was supposedly sold out within six hours. Yet ample supplies proved to be available at higher prices from insiders, including Horace Grant.

Low-mintage commemoratives were sometimes held back from sale by the distributor in anticipation of skyrocketing prices in those days, and Grant ran an advertisement in the April 1936 issue of The Numismatist offering the coins for $7.50 per set of three by mint mark, or $2.75 individually. By June, he was offering to exchange the Rhode Island half dollars for other coins or sell them for $9 per set of three. On June 24, the Tercentenary Commission announced that it would sell the first 100 from each mint in sets of three by matched numbers, by sealed-bid auction, but none of these sets has been identified.

There was widespread anger among coin collectors, and lawsuits were filed against the commission. Among those who litigated was Texas coin dealer L.W. Hoffecker, but he dropped the suit in exchange for 90 sets of three coins. In the years that followed, he complained to other dealers about the ethics of Grant and the Rhode Island officials. Hoffecker was influential in Congress (Note: Hoffecker had gotten two coin issues through Congress himself, the Old Spanish Trail half dollar (1935) and the Elgin, Illinois, Centennial half dollar (1936).) and complained to Senator Metcalf about the situation. Metcalf suggested another act for another 50,000 coins, but Hoffecker advised against it unless some neutral party handled the distribution, lest they be hoarded. He complained that "every bank in Rhode Island is making a lot of money, instead of distributing the coins".

Congress ended the authorization for outstanding commemorative coin issues in 1939; the Oregon Trail Memorial half dollar, for example, had been issued for over a decade. Hoffecker was elected president of the American Numismatic Association that same year, and he wrote to numismatist Walter P. Nichols in November expressing concerns about Grant's ethics. By then, the Rhode Island Tercentenary Committee had been dissolved, having shown a profit of $24,000 on the 50,000 coins issued. About two-thirds of that went towards a memorial to Roger Williams. The deluxe 2015 edition of R. S. Yeoman's A Guide Book of United States Coins (the Red Book) notes that the distribution of the coin "was wrapped in controversy—phony news releases reported that the coin was sold out when it was indeed not, and certain dealers procured large amounts at low prices only to resell for tidy profits."

By 1940, the price on the secondary market had dropped back to $4.50 per set of three, but it then rose steadily and reached $975 during the commemorative coin boom of 1980. The 2017 Red Book lists the coin between $325 and $675 per set of three, depending on condition, with single coins about a third of that. A near-pristine specimen from the San Francisco Mint sold at auction in 2014 for $6,463.

== Sources ==
- Bowers, Q. David (1992). Commemorative Coins of the United States: A Complete Encyclopedia. Wolfeboro, New Hampshire: Bowers and Merena Galleries, Inc. ISBN 978-0-943161-35-8.
- Flynn, Kevin (2008). The Authoritative Reference on Commemorative Coins 1892–1954. Roswell, Georgia: Kyle Vick. OCLC 711779330.
- Slabaugh, Arlie R. (1975). United States Commemorative Coinage (second ed.). Racine, Wisconsin: Whitman Publishing. ISBN 978-0-307-09377-6.
- Swiatek, Anthony (2012). Encyclopedia of the Commemorative Coins of the United States. Chicago: KWS Publishers. ISBN 978-0-9817736-7-4.
- Swiatek, Anthony; Breen, Walter (1981). The Encyclopedia of United States Silver & Gold Commemorative Coins, 1892 to 1954. New York: Arco Publishing. ISBN 978-0-668-04765-4.
- Taxay, Don (1967). An Illustrated History of U.S. Commemorative Coinage. New York: Arco Publishing. ISBN 978-0-668-01536-3.
- United States Senate Committee on Banking and Currency (April 11, 1935). Coins in Commemoration of the Founding of the City of Hudson, N. Y. (PDF). Washington, D.C.: United States Government Printing Office.
- Vermeule, Cornelius (1971). Numismatic Art in America. Cambridge, Massachusetts: The Belknap Press of Harvard University Press. ISBN 978-0-674-62840-3.
- Yeoman, R.S. (2015). A Guide Book of United States Coins (1st Deluxe ed.). Atlanta, Georgia: Whitman Publishing. ISBN 978-0-7948-4307-6.
- Yeoman, R.S. (2017). Bressett, Kenneth (ed.). A Guide Book of United States Coins 2018 (71st ed.). Atlanta, Georgia: Whitman Publishing. ISBN 978-0794845032.
