= Gadsden Purchase half dollar =

Proposed commemorative U.S. coin

The Gadsden Purchase half dollar was a proposed commemorative coin to be issued by the United States Bureau of the Mint. Legislation for the half dollar passed both houses of Congress in 1930 but was vetoed by President Herbert Hoover. The House of Representatives sustained his action, 96 votes in favor of overriding it to 243 opposed, well short of the necessary two-thirds majority. This was the first veto of Hoover's presidency and the first ever for a commemorative coin bill.

The proposal to commemorate the 1854 congressional ratification of the Gadsden Purchase was the brainchild of El Paso coin dealer Lyman W. Hoffecker, who wanted a commemorative coin he could control and distribute. He gained the support of several members of Congress from Texas and the Southwest, and a bill was introduced in Congress in April 1929, receiving a hearing 11 months later. Treasury Secretary Andrew W. Mellon sent a letter and two officials in opposition to the bill, but it passed both houses of Congress without dissent. On April 21, 1930, Hoover vetoed the bill, deeming commemorative coins abusive. Although only one congressman spoke in favor of Hoover's action during the override debate in the House, the veto was easily sustained.

No commemorative coins were struck during the remainder of the Hoover Administration. They resumed after Franklin D. Roosevelt was inaugurated, but by 1935 Roosevelt was citing Hoover's veto in urging Congress to avoid passing commemorative coin bills. He vetoed one in 1938. In 1946, Harry S. Truman adopted similar arguments in warning he would oppose further coin bills, and he vetoed one in 1947. Dwight D. Eisenhower vetoed three more in 1954. No non-circulating commemorative coins were struck from 1955 until after the Treasury Department changed its position in 1981.

== Hearing ==
The Gadsden Purchase came as the result of negotiation between the U.S. minister to Mexico James Gadsden and Mexican president Antonio López de Santa Anna. Following the Mexican–American War, there were border disputes along the Mexican Cession left unresolved by the Treaty of Guadalupe Hidalgo. Specifically, Southerners in the United States sought land over which a southern route of a transcontinental railroad could run. Accordingly, U.S. President Franklin Pierce sent Gadsden to resolve these issues. The resulting treaty was signed on December 30, 1853. Initially, 45,000 square miles (120,000 km^{2}) were to be conveyed in exchange for $15 million. But when the original treaty failed to pass the U.S. Senate, both the land and the payment were reduced by about a third. The Gadsden Purchase, west of El Paso, forms part of the states of Arizona and New Mexico.

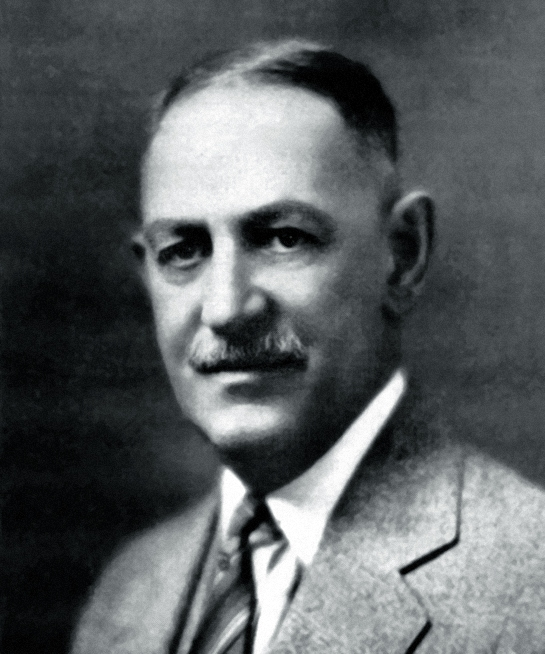
L.W. Hoffecker

During the late 1920s, El Paso coin dealer Lyman W. Hoffecker tried hard to gain congressional approval for a half dollar commemorating the 75th anniversary of the Gadsden Purchase. In 1929, he founded the Gadsden Purchase Commission (essentially just Hoffecker himself). At the time, commemorative coins were not sold by the government—Congress, in authorizing legislation, usually designated an organization which had the exclusive right to purchase them at face value and vend them to the public at a premium. Hoffecker wanted to be able to control the distribution of the Gadsden Purchase half dollars.

The April 1929 issue of The Numismatist printed a letter from Hoffecker, who was said to have designed the proposed coin and would be responsible for its distribution. It stated that Texas Congressman Claude Benton Hudspeth of El Paso had agreed to introduce legislation for the Gadsden piece. Hoffecker related that the coin would have the portrait of Gadsden on its obverse and on its reverse a map of New Mexico and Arizona depicting the purchased lands and El Paso. Ten thousand coins were to be sought, to be issued at $1.50 (equivalent to $23 in 2020) each.

Hudspeth introduced a bill for a Gadsden Purchase half dollar into the House of Representatives on April 25, 1929; it was referred to the Committee on Coinage, Weights, and Measures. On January 29, 1930, committee chairman Randolph Perkins of New Jersey sent a letter to Treasury Secretary Andrew W. Mellon, enquiring as to the Treasury's views. Mellon replied on the 31st, opposing the bill. He felt that Congress had wisely decided in 1890 that coin designs should not be changed more often than once in 25 years, and that the 15 commemorative coin bills passed since 1920 were wasteful and a burden on the Mint. He noted that in 1927, at the time of the Vermont Sesquicentennial half dollar, the Coinage Committee had gone on record in opposition of commemorative coin issues, many of which were only of local and not national significance. Several issues had failed to sell out, resulting in coins being returned to the Mint to be melted, and he suggested that a medal be issued instead of a coin. On March 8, Hoffecker sent a telegram to the committee offering to pay for the entire issue of 10,000 anytime the department wanted, and given that the Mint had produced over 30,000,000 coins for other nations in 1929, any burden posed by commemorative half dollars was slight.

Hearings were held by the committee on the bill on March 10 (briefly) and 17, 1930, with Perkins presiding. On the 17th, Congressman Guinn Williams appeared on behalf of Hudspeth, who was ill. Williams, a Texan, stated that the coin issue was important to the entire Southwest, that proponents would not allow the government to incur any expense, and stated that they were ready to pay for the coins. He also presented a joint resolution of the houses of the Texas Legislature, asking the state's representatives to introduce and support a bill for a Gadsden Purchase half dollar. Next to speak was Albert Gallatin Simms of New Mexico, who assured the committee of his support for the bill, and that of his state's two senators. Hudspeth sent a letter, and his secretary Kate George told the committee that the senators from Texas, New Mexico and Arizona were unanimously in favor of the bill. Hudspeth's letter stated he had been told by Hoffecker's committee that the money from the coins would be used to set up a small monument where the U.S. flag had first been raised in the Gadsden Purchase.

Mellon had sent two Treasury officials to the hearing, Assistant Secretary Walter E. Hope and Assistant Director of the Mint Mary M. O'Reilly. In his testimony, Hope warned that the issuance of commemorative half dollars was leading to confusion, and there was a risk of counterfeiting. Sales for some issues had not met expectations, resulting in many commemoratives being returned to the Mint for redemption and melting. O'Reilly told of a man who was about to be put off a Philadelphia streetcar, having only a commemorative half dollar to pay the fare, something not recognized by the conductor. He was allowed to remain after the superintendent of the Philadelphia Mint, also a passenger, paid his fare. Luther A. Johnson of Texas appeared in support of the bill, and presented a letter from Hoffecker dated March 5, stating that the coins could be easily sold, and that when his committee had met with President Herbert Hoover, the president had told them the event should be fittingly celebrated. After the testimony concluded, the Coinage Committee went into executive session and endorsed the bill.

== Passage by Congress ==
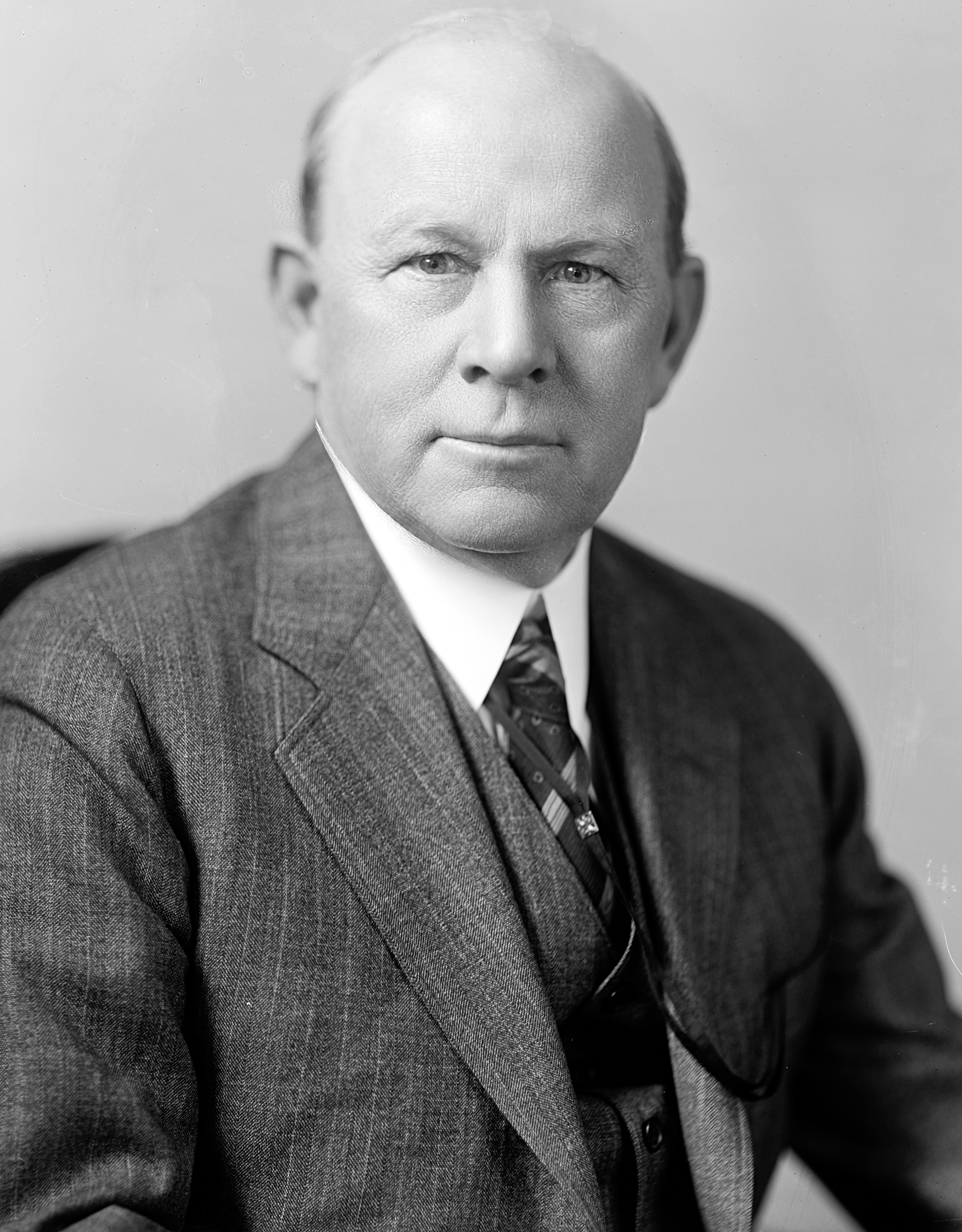
Congressman Randolph Perkins

Perkins's committee issued a report dated March 17, 1930, stating that the anniversary of the Gadsden Purchase was of international importance, and there was no risk to the Treasury given the willingness of Hoffecker to pay for the coins. On March 19, Perkins called up the bill before the House, and it passed without debate or dissent. Immediately thereafter, Perkins had another commemorative coin bill passed by the House, for the 300th anniversary of Massachusetts Bay Colony.

In the Senate, the Gadsden bill was referred to the Committee on Banking and Currency. On April 2, the committee issued a report through Tom Connally of Texas, similar to the House report (of which a copy was attached), recommending passage. On April 7, the bill passed the Senate without debate or opposition. The bill was engrossed and signed on April 9 by the Speaker of the House pro tempore and by Charles Curtis, Vice President of the United States, and was presented to President Hoover on April 10.

== Veto and override attempt ==
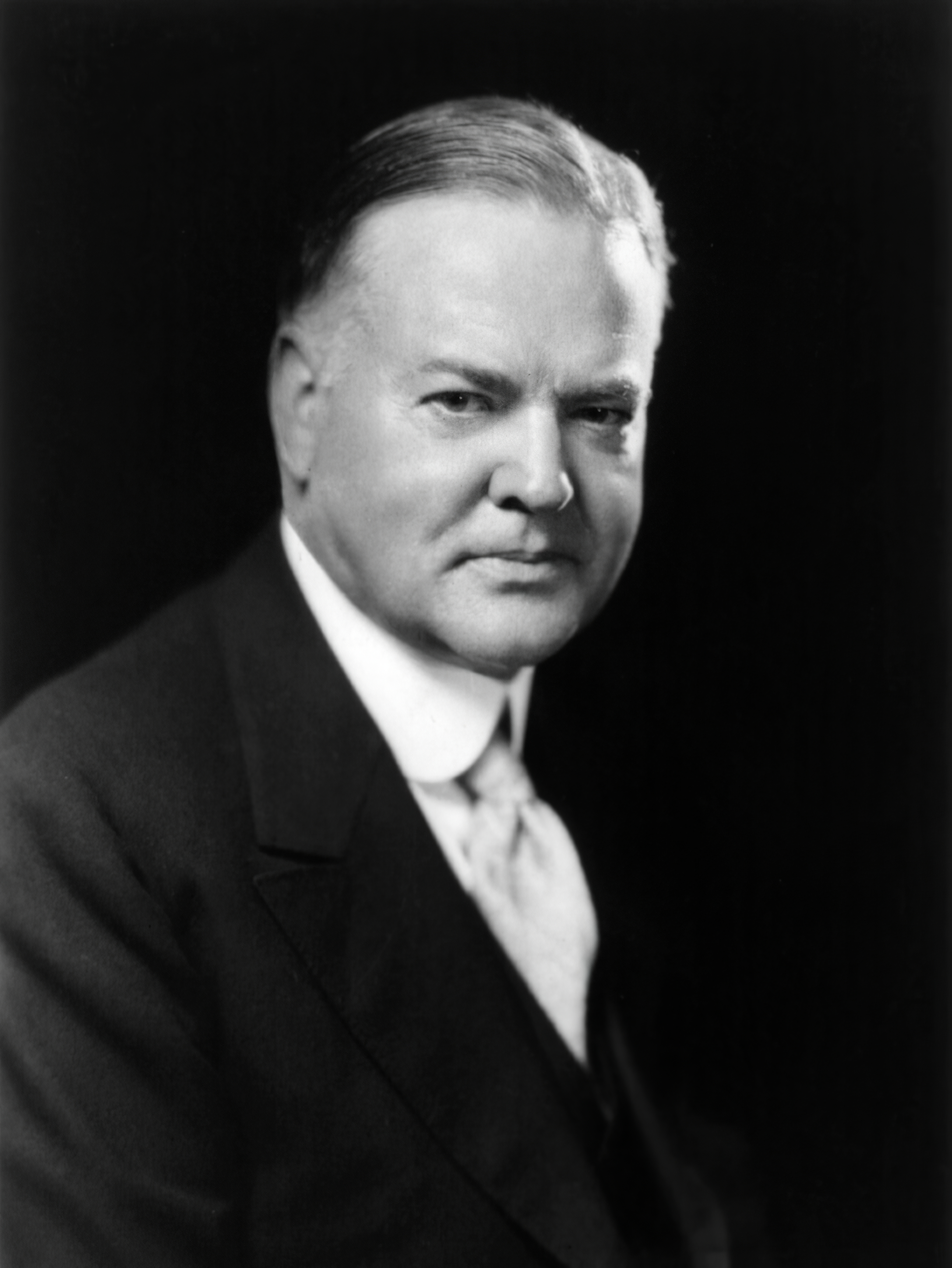
President Herbert Hoover

On April 21, 1930, Hoover vetoed the bill, returning it unsigned with a list of his objections to the House of Representatives where it originated. This veto was the first of Hoover's presidency, and the first time a commemorative coin bill had been vetoed. The president vetoed the bill on the advice of the Treasury Department. Hoover noted the issuance of 15 commemorative coins over the past decade, something he said allowed the opportunity for counterfeiting. He stated, "the matter is not perhaps one of large importance in itself, were it not for the fact of the great number of other similar proposals"—he noted the five other commemorative coin bills then before Congress, and if the Gadsden Purchase bill were enacted, it would be harder to turn down the other proposals. Deeming the issuance of commemorative coins a misuse of the coinage system, he offered the government's assistance in the production of medals, which could provide a souvenir without impacting the coinage. Hoover's attitude was said to be informed by fundraising committees returning large amounts of several commemorative coin issues to the Mint for redemption and melting, something he considered wasteful.

The day after the veto, the House Coinage Committee sought a vote to override it. Many of the bill's proponents came to the House floor to back the override, with the support of members from other parts of the country who sought commemorative coins. Those who would override dominated the debate, with only one speaker, House Majority Leader John Q. Tilson of Connecticut, supporting the president. The override attempt fell well short of the two-thirds needed, as 96 representatives voted in favor of the override, with 243 against it. Five Republicans voted to override Hoover's veto: New Mexico Congressman Simms and four from the East and Midwest.

The New York Sun applauded Hoover's "sound common sense" while Hoffecker's hometown paper, the El Paso Herald, stated that "President Hoover administered a figurative slap to Arizona, New Mexico and El Paso". On April 26, The Washington Post published an editorial in favor of Hoover's action:

It is to be hoped that the practice of minting special coins for occasions of this kind is definitely at an end ... The issuance of commemorative coins has become a nuisance ... Yet if Congress thus favors one celebration, how can it refuse another? The only sound policy is uniform coinage for use only as a means of exchange. The clamor for souvenir coins arises from the fact that they may be sold at a profit. But Congress has authorized the minting of so many souvenir coins recently that profits have fallen off. ... President Hoover's judgment ... meets with general approval.

== Aftermath ==
According to David Bullowa in his 1938 volume on commemoratives, "with the vetoing of the Gadsden Purchase half-dollar proposal ... a statement was issued that commemorative coins were superfluous and that their purpose might be as well accomplished with officially authorized medals. These pieces, if struck, would adequately serve collectors, it was thought, and such pieces would not tend to 'confuse the coinage'."

No commemorative coins were authorized or struck during the remainder of Hoover's presidency. Following the inauguration of Hoover's successor, Franklin D. Roosevelt, striking and authorization of commemoratives resumed. By 1935, Roosevelt had warned Congress against issuing large numbers of commemoratives and repeated this in 1937, both times citing Hoover's veto of the Gadsden Purchase bill, and urging the issuance of medals instead. He vetoed a coin bill in 1938 for the 400th anniversary of Coronado's expedition. In 1946, President Harry Truman signed the first authorizations for commemorative coins since 1937, but cited the Treasury's position and stated he would not look with favor on further issues. Citing Hoover's veto, he vetoed a bill for a commemorative half dollar for the centennial of Wisconsin statehood on July 31, 1947. Similar arguments were made by the Treasury under the presidency of Dwight D. Eisenhower, who vetoed three commemorative coin bills in 1954. No commemoratives were issued thereafter until the department changed its position in 1981, as the Washington 250th Anniversary half dollar was being considered; it was issued in 1982. The government sold the new commemoratives to collectors and dealers, rather than having sales conducted by a designated group.

Although Hoffecker was unsuccessful with the Gadsden Purchase piece, he tried again in 1935. He was the designer and distributor of the Old Spanish Trail half dollar and was also the distributor of the Elgin, Illinois, Centennial half dollar (1936). In 1936, Hoffecker testified before Congress on the abuses committed by the distributors of commemorative coins. From 1939 to 1941, he served as president of the American Numismatic Association. He died in 1955.

== See also ==
- Louisiana Purchase Sesquicentennial half dollar, vetoed by Eisenhower in 1954.

== Sources ==
- Bowers, Q. David (October 1991). "The story of two commemoratives". The Numismatist. American Numismatic Association: 1623–1625. (subscription required)
- Bowers, Q. David (1992). Commemorative Coins of the United States: A Complete Encyclopedia. Wolfeboro, NH: Bowers and Merena Galleries, Inc. ISBN 978-0-943161-35-8.
- Bullowa, David M. (1938). "The Commemorative Coinage of the United States 1892–1938". Numismatic Notes and Monographs (83). New York: American Numismatic Society: i–192. JSTOR 43607181. (subscription required)
- Duffield, Frank (uncredited) (April 1929). "Another commemorative half-dollar this year". The Numismatist. American Numismatic Association: 236–237. (subscription required)
- Duffield, Frank (uncredited) (June 1930). "The House upholds President Hoover's veto". The Numismatist. American Numismatic Association: 380–383. (subscription required)
- Ganz, David L. (October 1991). "Commemorative coinage enters a new golden age". The Numismatist. American Numismatic Association: 1550–1557. (subscription required)
- Slabaugh, Arlie R. (1975). United States Commemorative Coinage (second ed.). Racine, WI: Whitman Publishing. ISBN 978-0-307-09377-6.
- "Memorandum of disapproval". The Numismatist. American Numismatic Association: 781–782. November 1947. (subscription required)
- United States House of Representatives (April 25, 1929). "H.R. 2029". United States Government Printing Office. (subscription required)
- United States House of Representatives Committee on Coinage, Weights, and Measures (March 1930). To authorize the coinage of silver 50-cent pieces for the seventy-fifth anniversary of the Gadsden Purchase (PDF). United States Government Printing Office. (subscription required)
- United States House of Representatives Committee on Coinage, Weights, and Measures (March 17, 1930). Authorize coinage of silver 50-cent pieces in commemoration of seventy-fifth anniversary of the Gadsden Purchase. United States Government Printing Office. (subscription required)
- United States Senate Committee on Banking and Currency (April 2, 1930). To authorize the coinage of silver 50-cent pieces commemorating the seventy-fifth anniversary of the Gadsden Purchase. United States Government Printing Office. (subscription required)
- United States Senate Committee on Banking and Currency (February 10, 1947). Commemorative coins and Mint bills. United States Government Printing Office. (subscription required)
