= Hudson Sesquicentennial half dollar =

1935 commemorative U.S. coin

Hudson, New York, Sesquicentennial half dollar
- United States
- Value: 50 cents (0.50 US dollars)
- Mass: 12.5 g
- Diameter: 30.61 mm (1.20 in)
- Thickness: 2.15 mm (0.08 in)
- Edge: Reeded
- Composition: 90.0% silver; 10.0% copper
- Silver: 0.36169 troy oz
- Years of minting: 1935
- Mintage: 10,008 including 8 pieces for the Assay Commission
- Mint marks: None, all pieces struck at the Philadelphia Mint without mint mark

Obverse
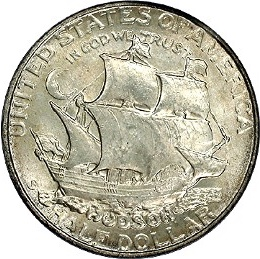
- Design: Ship, the Half Moon
- Designer: Chester Beach
- Design date: 1935

Reverse
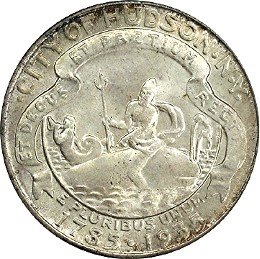
- Design: Seal of the city of Hudson
- Designer: Chester Beach
- Design date: 1935

The Hudson, New York, Sesquicentennial half dollar, sometimes called the Hudson Sesquicentennial half dollar, is a commemorative fifty-cent piece struck by the United States Bureau of the Mint in 1935. The coin was designed by Chester Beach. Its obverse depicts the Half Moon, flagship of Henry Hudson, after whom the city of Hudson, New York is named. In addition to showing the ship, the coin displays a version of the Hudson city seal, with Neptune riding a whale, a design that has drawn commentary over the years.

Although the city of Hudson was a relatively small municipality, legislation to issue a coin in honor of its 150th anniversary went through Congress without opposition and was signed by President Franklin D. Roosevelt, becoming the Act of May 2, 1935. In June 1935, 10,000 Hudson half dollars were distributed to civic authorities for sale to the public.

Most of the coins were likely bought by coin dealers, leaving few for collectors, with the result that prices spiked from the $1 cost at the time of issue. This caused anger among coin collectors at the time, but the coin's value has increased steadily since then.

== Background and legislation ==
Hudson, New York, the seat of Columbia County, lies on the east bank of the Hudson River, some 30 miles (48 km) south of Albany. It was founded in 1662 under the name Claverack Landing. Originally a trading post for the Rensselaer family, it saw considerable expansion in the early 1780s and was incorporated under the name Hudson in 1785. During the 1930s, it had about 14,000 residents.

In 1935, commemorative coins were not sold by the government—Congress, in authorizing legislation, usually designated an organization which had the exclusive right to purchase them at face value and vend them to the public at a premium. In the case of the Hudson half dollar, the responsible official or group was to be designated by the Mayor of Hudson.

A bill for a half dollar to commemorate the 150th anniversary of the incorporation of Hudson was introduced in the House of Representatives by New York Congressman Philip A. Goodwin on March 6, 1935, and provided for 6,000 pieces. It was referred to the Committee on Coinage, Weights, and Measures. Goodwin was the longtime president of the Greene County Historical Society, and introduced the bill as a favor for friends in nearby Hudson. A report was issued by Missouri's John J. Cochran, acting chairman of the committee, on April 2, 1935, recommending that the bill pass with an amendment increasing the mintage to 10,000, and noting that Goodwin had appeared before the committee to pledge that the entire quantity struck would be taken up by the city authorities, and thus there would be no coins left on the Mint's hands. On April 3, immediately after the House passed a bill for the Old Spanish Trail half dollar, it passed the bill for the Hudson piece on Cochran's motion, without debate or opposition. The Missouri congressman also included his report in the Congressional Record.

The bill thus passed to the Senate, where it was referred to the Committee on Banking and Currency. On April 11, 1935, New York Senator Robert F. Wagner issued a report, recommending that the bill pass unamended. When the bill was considered in the Senate on April 15, Rhode Island's Jesse H. Metcalf moved to amend it so the bill would also provide for the issuance of a Rhode Island Tercentenary half dollar. There was no objection or debate concerning either the amendment or the bill as a whole, and it passed the Senate.

Because the two chambers of Congress had passed different versions of the bill, it returned to the House of Representatives. There, on April 18, on motion of Cochran, the House agreed to the Senate amendments, and it was enacted on May 2 by the signature of President Franklin D. Roosevelt. Anthony Swiatek and Walter Breen, in their 1988 volume on commemoratives, suggested that the bill passed because of "probably the usual 'you vote for my bill and I'll vote for yours' arrangement".

== Preparation ==
On the day Roosevelt signed the legislation, Congressman Goodwin wrote to Charles Moore, chairman of the Commission of Fine Arts, requesting the names of suitable artists to design the coin. The commission was charged by a 1921 executive order by President Warren G. Harding with rendering advisory opinions regarding public artworks, including coins. Moore suggested Laura Gardin Fraser as standing in the first rank of medallists, with other possibilities to include Mint Chief Engraver John R. Sinnock, Paul Manship, Francis H. Packer and Chester Beach. Mayor Frank Wise of Hudson asked if John Flanagan, who had recently designed the Washington quarter, would do; Moore agreed by telegram. However, the commission went to Beach for $1,000; the sculptor also agreed to guide the city through the coin approval process.

Wise and his officials had tentatively decided to have a head of Henry Hudson on one side of the coin, with the city seal on the other. Beach quickly prepared sketches and met with Wise on May 13, but convinced the mayor that instead of the explorer (no actual portrait of him is known) his ship, the Half Moon, would be a better choice. Working at speed unusual for a commemorative coin of that era, Beach completed plaster models in one week, adding a crescent moon to the left of the ship. The models were converted to coinage dies by the Medallic Art Company of New York, who could accomplish the task faster than the Philadelphia Mint. Though records are not complete, the company apparently contacted the Mint for advice; Chief Engraver Sinnock sent it a letter on May 23. While unfamiliar with the Hudson legislation, Sinnock had confidence in Beach's ability because his previous designs were easy for the Mint to strike into coins. Beach quoted this praise in reporting to Moore on May 27 that Lee Lawrie, the sculptor-member of the Commission of Fine Arts, had approved the designs. Approval by the full commission followed on May 28, and by Secretary of the Treasury Henry Morgenthau a week later.

== Design ==
The obverse of the coin shows the Half Moon, Henry Hudson's flagship, sailing to the right. To the left of the merchantman's rigging is a stylized crescent moon. The ship is surrounded by two rings of lettering, the inner reading "IN GOD WE TRUST" and HUDSON, and the outer the name of the country and the coin's denomination. The designer's monogram, CB, may be found at the waterline on the left side of the coin. The reverse is a rendition of the city of Hudson's seal, with Neptune holding a trident, riding backward on a whale. A mermaid or triton in the background blows into a conch shell. The seal design reflects Hudson's heritage as a whaling port, although it is some distance up the Hudson River from the ocean. The motto ET DECUS ET PRETIUM RECTI (Both the honor and the reward of the righteous) is copied from the city seal; the name of the city and the anniversary dates surround the seal, with E PLURIBUS UNUM above the dates.

Don Taxay, in his book on commemorative coins, described the seal as "a rather whimsical composition"; Beach had deemed it "rather amusing" and had hoped the new coins "will be a little more interesting than the others I have done". Swiatek and Breen referenced "the quaint device of King Neptune riding backwards on a spouting whale, whose eye is represented as being about where its blowhole should be. Neptune is briefly clad in a wisp of cloth 'blowing in the wind'." They suggested that the position of the Moon meant, if it was waxing, that the ship was sailing west toward America, but if waning, was sailing east to Europe.

Art historian Cornelius Vermeule, in his volume about U.S. coins and medals, considered the ship on the obverse "straightforward fare for commemorative half-dollars", though he found the name "HUDSON" beneath the waves unneeded given the legend on the reverse. The reverse based on the city seal was to him "a harming throwback to colonial days, and in American numismatics to the quasi–federal and state issues of the period 1780 to 1792". Vermeule noted "the baroque motto above Neptune and his group [that] makes it evident that this subject, appealing and amusing in itself, appears here because it is the singular characteristic of the City of Hudson on the river of the same name".

== Production, distribution, and collecting ==
So far as known, this piece is the first ever dedicated to the coin collector. Everything about it shows the purpose for which it was issued. Behold, on the obverse, the ship of Hudson homeward bound in all its triumph. Is it not laden, oh, my friends, with the catch of a most profitable expedition to the Sea of Suckers, where the proverbial one is born every minute? ... But, ah! the reverse—can it really be the devil himself? Be still, my troubled heart, 'tis only the captain of the great Half Moon jauntily sporting his workaday clothes! Caught, too, in the very act of administering the coup-de-grace to the poor sucker that was snared into his trap. Another unsuspecting sucker may be seen nearby awaiting his turn and blowing his trumpet in anticipation of what he believes to be his great moment.

— "A. Shornlamb", The Numismatist, February 1936, p. 109.

On June 12, 1935, John Evans, vice president of the First National Bank of Hudson, wrote to Mary M. O'Reilly, the acting Director of the Mint, asking on behalf of Mayor Wise that only 6,000 coins be struck at that time, with the remainder to be coined later if demand justified it. But the Mint delivered the entire authorization of 10,000 on June 28, 1935. Reservations for coins had been taken since early May (at $1 per coin, plus postage of $.03 per two coins and registered mail fee of $.18 per order), and on July 2, 1935, Evans, who was in charge of distribution, began informing what Swiatek called "[i]nfuriated collectors" that the coins were sold out. Coin dealer Julius Guttag, of New York City's Guttag Brothers, is believed to have bought 7,500 coins at $.95 each, and Hubert W. Carcaba, of Saint Augustine, Florida, is believed to have bought 1,000. In addition to the 10,000 pieces distributed, eight coins were struck at Philadelphia and retained there to be available for inspection and testing at the 1936 meeting of the annual Assay Commission.

The uproar in the coin-collecting community resulted in bad publicity for the city of Hudson. Although the specifics of how the coins came to be so quickly sold out were not immediately known, collectors intuited a trick, especially when coins proved plentiful on the market at between $5 and $7 each. Many of these sold, helping set off a commemorative coin boom that continued later in 1935 when low-mintage varieties of the Daniel Boone Bicentennial half dollar came on the market after a similar immediate sellout. Collectors wrote angry letters to numismatic societies and periodicals, and the Hudson piece was among those that future American Numismatic Association president L. W. Hoffecker complained about to Congress when he testified in March 1936. By 1940, the price on the secondary market had dropped back to $5.50, and thereafter rose steadily and reached $1,700 during the commemorative coin boom of 1980. The 2017 edition of R. S. Yeoman's A Guide Book of United States Coins lists the coin for between $700 and $1,500, depending on condition. A near-pristine specimen sold at auction in 2014 for $15,275.

== Sources ==
- Bowers, Q. David (1992). Commemorative Coins of the United States: A Complete Encyclopedia. Wolfeboro, New Hampshire: Bowers and Merena Galleries, Inc. ISBN 978-0-943161-35-8.
- Flynn, Kevin (2008). The Authoritative Reference on Commemorative Coins 1892–1954. Roswell, Georgia: Kyle Vick. OCLC 711779330.
- Slabaugh, Arlie R. (1975). United States Commemorative Coinage (second ed.). Racine, Wisconsin: Whitman Publishing. ISBN 978-0-307-09377-6.
- Swiatek, Anthony (2012). Encyclopedia of the Commemorative Coins of the United States. Chicago: KWS Publishers. ISBN 978-0-9817736-7-4.
- Swiatek, Anthony; Breen, Walter (1981). The Encyclopedia of United States Silver & Gold Commemorative Coins, 1892 to 1954. New York: Arco Publishing. ISBN 978-0-668-04765-4.
- Taxay, Don (1967). An Illustrated History of U.S. Commemorative Coinage. New York: Arco Publishing. ISBN 978-0-668-01536-3.
- United States House of Representatives Committee on Coinage, Weights and Measures (April 2, 1935). Coinage of 50-cent Pieces in Commemoration of the One Hundred and Fiftieth Anniversary of the Founding of the City of Hudson, N. Y. (PDF). Washington, D.C.: United States Government Printing Office.
- United States Senate Committee on Banking and Currency (April 11, 1935). Coins in Commemoration of the Founding of the City of Hudson, N. Y. (PDF). Washington, D.C.: United States Government Printing Office.
- Vermeule, Cornelius (1971). Numismatic Art in America. Cambridge, Massachusetts: The Belknap Press of Harvard University Press. ISBN 978-0-674-62840-3.
- Yeoman, R.S. (2015). A Guide Book of United States Coins (1st Deluxe ed.). Atlanta, Georgia: Whitman Publishing. ISBN 978-0-7948-4307-6.
- Yeoman, R.S. (2017). Bressett, Kenneth (ed.). A Guide Book of United States Coins 2018 (71st ed.). Atlanta, Georgia: Whitman Publishing. ISBN 978-0794845032.
