= Rovelstad =

Rovelstad is a Norwegian surname. Notable people with the surname include:

- Tommy Rovelstad (born 1972), Norwegian sledge hockey player
- Trygve Rovelstad (1903–1990), American sculptor and medal designer
