= Elgin, Illinois, Centennial half dollar =

1936 commemorative U.S. coin

- United States
- Value: 50 cents (0.50 US dollars)
- Mass: 12.5 g
- Diameter: 30.61 mm (1.20 in)
- Thickness: 2.15 mm (0.08 in)
- Edge: Reeded
- Composition: 90.0% silver; 10.0% copper
- Silver: 0.36169 troy oz
- Years of minting: 1936
- Mintage: 25,015 (5,000 melted)
- Mint marks: None, all pieces struck at Philadelphia Mint without mint mark

Obverse
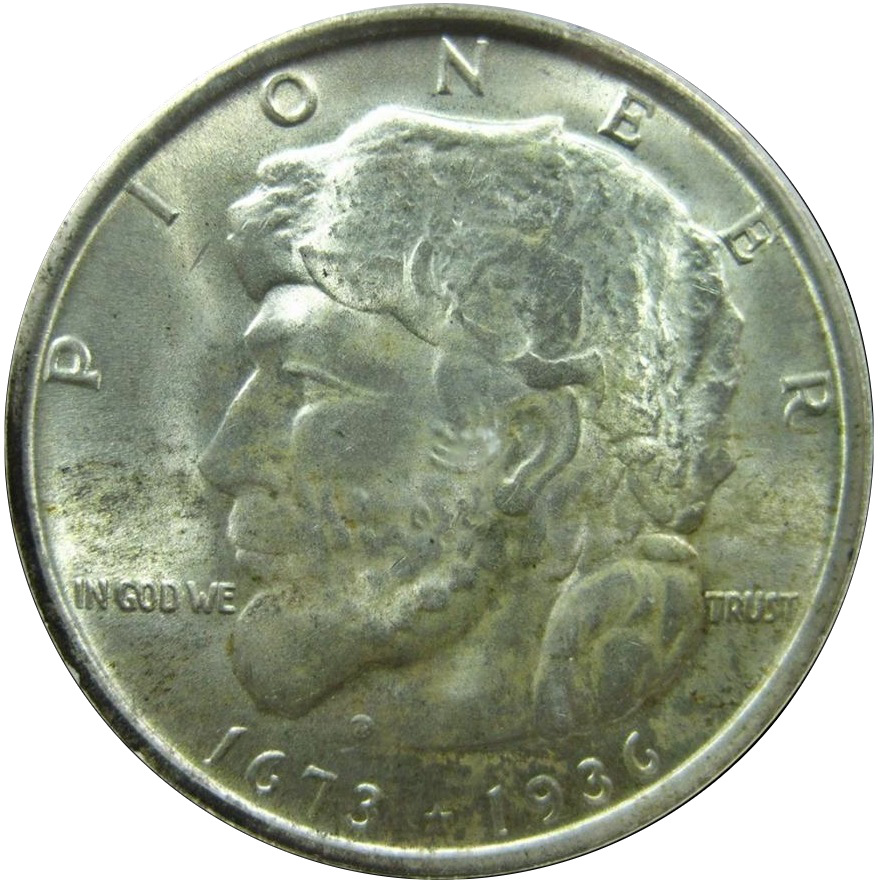
- Design: Bust of a pioneer
- Designer: Trygve Rovelstad
- Design date: 1936

Reverse
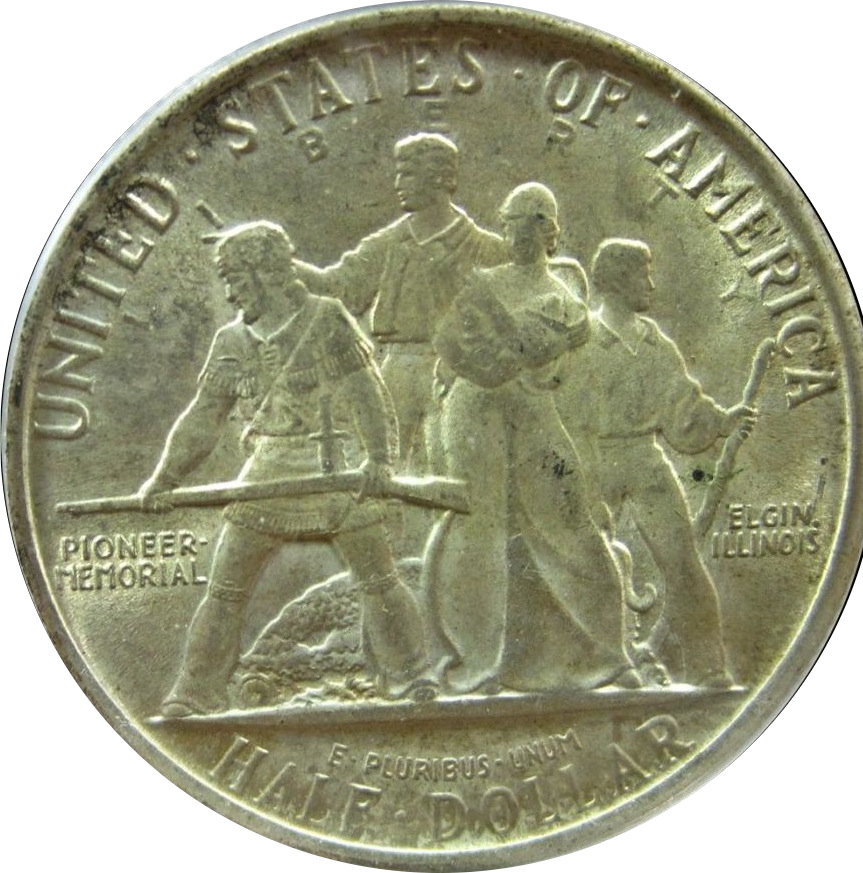
- Design: Pioneer family
- Designer: Trygve Rovelstad
- Design date: 1936

The Elgin, Illinois, Centennial half dollar was a fifty-cent commemorative coin issued by the United States Bureau of the Mint in 1936, part of the wave of commemoratives authorized by Congress and struck that year. Intended to commemorate the centennial of the founding of Elgin, the piece was designed by local sculptor Trygve Rovelstad. The obverse depicts an idealized head of a pioneer man. The reverse shows a grouping of pioneers, and is based upon a sculptural group that Rovelstad hoped to build as a memorial to those who settled Illinois, but which was not erected in his lifetime.

Rovelstad had heard of other efforts to gain authorization for commemorative coins, which were sold by the Mint to a designated group at face value and then retailed to the public at a premium. In 1935, through his congressman, he had legislation introduced into the House of Representatives for a commemorative coin in honor of Elgin's centennial that year. Rovelstad hoped that the proposed coin would both depict and be a source of funds for his memorial to the pioneers. Texas coin dealer L.W. Hoffecker heard of the effort and contacted Rovelstad to offer his assistance—Hoffecker had been a force behind the Old Spanish Trail half dollar, issued in 1935 and distributed by him.

The bill for the Elgin coin did not pass until 1936. Hoffecker was able to sell about 20,000 coins, four-fifths of the issue: the remaining 5,000 were returned to the Mint for melting. Unlike many commemorative coins of that era, the piece was not bought up by dealers and speculators, but was sold directly to collectors at the issue price. Art historian Cornelius Vermeule considered the Elgin coin among the most outstanding American commemoratives.

== Inception ==
Elgin, Illinois, is located on the Fox River about 30 miles (48 km) west of Chicago. The community was founded in 1835 by James and Hezekiah Gifford, who named it. It became a village in 1847 and a city in 1854. In the latter year, a watch company was founded there, and the city became well known for the firm's timepieces; it also was notable for the production of tools, shoes, wood products, and weekly church bulletins.

Sculptor Trygve Rovelstad (1903–1990), born to Norwegian immigrants in the United States, sought to erect a statue in his hometown of Elgin as a monument to those pioneers who had settled Illinois. The city leaders approved, and in 1934, a foundation was laid for the statue in Davidson Park, the site of the Giffords' first cabin. Rovelstad was unable to raise the money to construct and erect the statue, but having learned of recent commemorative coin issues, decided this would be a good means of funding the statue. The sculptor had a bill introduced in Congress in May 1935 to authorize a half dollar to celebrate Elgin's centennial and to honor the pioneer. Nevertheless, the bill initially was not considered.

News of the bill appeared in the July 1935 The Numismatist (the journal of the American Numismatic Association [ANA]), and on July 11, Lyman W. Hoffecker wrote to the Elgin Centennial Monumental Committee, inquiring how the coins would be distributed. Hoffecker, an El Paso, Texas, coin dealer, was then leading the committee in his hometown that was selling the Old Spanish Trail half dollar to the public. Although some recent commemoratives had sparked outcry from collectors that speculators had been allowed to buy up quantities of the new issues, Hoffecker would gain praise for equitably distributing the Old Spanish Trail piece.

In the correspondence between the two men, Hoffecker gave Rovelstad a number of tips about how to deal with Congress. Even though the bill was still mired in committee, Hoffecker advised what to do once the bill was signed. He did not know yet that Rovelstad was a sculptor, and wrote to him in September 1935 about the models to be submitted for approval, "These should also be 10 [inches, or 25.4 cm] in diameter, and this is where your trouble commences. These sculptors all want to incorporate their own ideas in the design and ask anywhere from $400.00 to $1,000.00 for their work, telling you what trouble it is to get the approval of the Commission of Fine Arts and many other things which do not exist." Hoffecker also offered to handle the issue for the committee; he proposed to advance the money necessary to purchase the new coins from the government and to handle the distribution. He stated that he had enjoyed the distribution of the Old Spanish Trail piece, though he lied to Rovelstad, stating he was not a coin dealer—the letterhead that Hoffecker used to write to Rovelstad said "Loans and Mortgages" under his name. He also warned Rovelstad, "It would not be good for either of us if the word got out you had disposed of the entire issue to me."

In October 1935, Hoffecker made a formal offer, based on the bill, which called for 10,000 half dollars: he would pay the Elgin committee $12,000 and sell the coins at $2.00 each. He would advance the face value of the coins to the Mint, as well as engraving and shipping charges. In selling the coins, he would try to distribute them to as many collectors as possible, leaving dealers and speculators for later. Rovelstad agreed by letter in November.

== Preparation ==
Illinois Representative Chauncey Reed had introduced the Elgin coin legislation at Rovelstad's behest, and both the sculptor and Hoffecker worked with him to advance the bill through Congress. In February 1936, Hoffecker, who had been appointed by ANA President T. James Clarke to lead a committee against abuses in the issuance of commemorative coins, went to Washington, passing through Chicago on his way to visit Rovelstad. The two men had hoped to keep the mintage to 10,000, to be able to sell the coins at a higher price. Congress, however, was not minded to create a low-mintage commemorative, as there had been several issues which had been struck in small numbers only to sell at high prices, and the bill was amended to provide for 25,000 half dollars. Hoffecker hoped to lower the number, urging the sculptor to lobby for a decrease. Hoffecker noted it would be much more work to sell 25,000, and they could not command as high a price. There were a large number of commemorative coin bills in Congress in 1936, and the dealer feared that President Franklin D. Roosevelt would start vetoing them. Hoffecker visited Washington twice more in May, once meeting Rovelstad there, where they lobbied members of Congress.

The bill finally passed, and was signed by President Roosevelt on June 16, 1936. The bill required the coins to be struck at a single mint and to bear the date "1936" regardless of when they were struck. All 25,000 would have to be paid for by the chairman of the Elgin committee (that is, Rovelstad) at one time; a lesser quantity could not be issued. The pieces were "in commemoration of the one-hundredth anniversary of the founding of the city of Elgin, Illinois, and the erection of the heroic Pioneer Memorial"—Rovelstad's statue.

Hoffecker suggested that Rovelstad seek to have the mintage divided among the three mints, but conceded that unless Congress had erred in the enacted language, this gambit was not likely to succeed. He also told Rovelstad to get in touch with Assistant Mint Director Mary M. O'Reilly and seek to have the coins struck at the Denver Mint, as the closest mint to El Paso, to minimize shipping charges. Nothing came of either proposal; all of the coins would be struck at the Philadelphia Mint.

After Rovelstad submitted his designs for the coin to the Mint, they were sent to the Commission of Fine Arts for its opinion. The designs arrived on July 15, 1936, and were approved two days later, with the request that the head of the pioneer on the obverse, in three-quarter view (facing forward and to one side) as submitted by Rovelstad, be in profile instead. The sculptor complied, and submitted plaster models by mid-August; photographs were sent to the commission by the Mint on August 15. Two days later, commission chairman Charles Moore wrote to O'Reilly, stating that the sculptor member of the commission, Lee Lawrie, had viewed the designs, and complained he could not see what the object was behind the pioneers, and that the gun appeared to be held awkwardly. Lawrie also stated that some of the lettering should be strengthened, but if the Mint director, Nellie Tayloe Ross, was not disturbed by these things, the coin should go forward. Moore indicated that he had no desire to delay the coin, and forwarded the commission's recommendation, on condition that the Mint do what it could to address these concerns. With the exception of possible work on the lettering, no changes were made.

Once the commission had approved the designs, they were immediately sent to the Medallic Art Company of New York, which reduced the designs to furnish hubs from which coinage dies could be made. In early October 1936, the Philadelphia Mint struck 25,000 coins, with 15 extra for inspection by the 1937 Assay Commission. Rovelstad went to Philadelphia to witness the initiation of production and stayed at the home of Mint Chief Engraver John R. Sinnock. The first ten pieces were handed to the sculptor, who placed them in paper envelopes and took them home to Illinois. According to his wife, Gloria, he was offered a job at the Mint by Sinnock but declined.

== Design ==
The obverse of the Elgin Centennial half dollar depicts a pioneer, attested to by the legend above him. The bearded visage had been previously sculpted by Rovelstad and appears, slightly modified, as the head of the rifleman on the left of the group on the reverse. The year "1673" on the obverse marks the year explorers Louis Jolliet and Jacques Marquette entered what is now Illinois. Although the coin was issued for Elgin's centennial, neither the date of founding (1835) nor that of the anniversary appears.

The reverse side depicts a group of pioneers (four adults and a baby in its mother's arms). The grouping is a bas relief of the model for the memorial that Rovelstad hoped to build. The child is the second baby to be implied, but not fully seen, on a US coin–one is sketched with the mother inside the Conestoga wagon on the Oregon Trail Memorial half dollar, first struck in 1926. One would be more fully depicted on the Roanoke Island half dollar in 1937. The grouping had also appeared on Rovelstad's 1935 medal for Elgin's centennial. Rovelstad placed, both on the medal and on the base for the statue, the words, "To the men who have blazed the trails, who have conquered the soil, and who have built an empire in the land of the Illini." Inclusion of the various mottos required by statute, such as "In God We Trust", meant that not even part of this dedication could be placed on the coin. The name of the city was not in the original models that Rovelstad sent Hoffecker for his comments; the numismatist wrote on July 15, 1936, "I would not overlook putting the word 'Elgin' on your coin, as it would be a good ad for your city".

Art historian Cornelius Vermeule, in his volume on the artistry of American coins, had high praise for the coin and its sculptor: "it is more difficult to find a more aesthetically satisfying, technically superior commemorative half-dollar than the Elgin, Illinois, Centennial of 1936." Vermeule observed that the figures on the reverse appear almost three-dimensional. He noted that the technique of spacing out the letters of the word "Pioneer" above the head presages that used by later Chief Engraver Gilroy Roberts on the obverse of the Kennedy half dollar. According to Vermeule, Rovelstad "has produced one of the major documents of sculptural plasticity and vibrant relief in the series of commemorative coins. His obverse is worthy of a Roman medallion, and his reverse rivals the great Neoclassic dies of England or Bavaria in the nineteenth century."

== Release ==
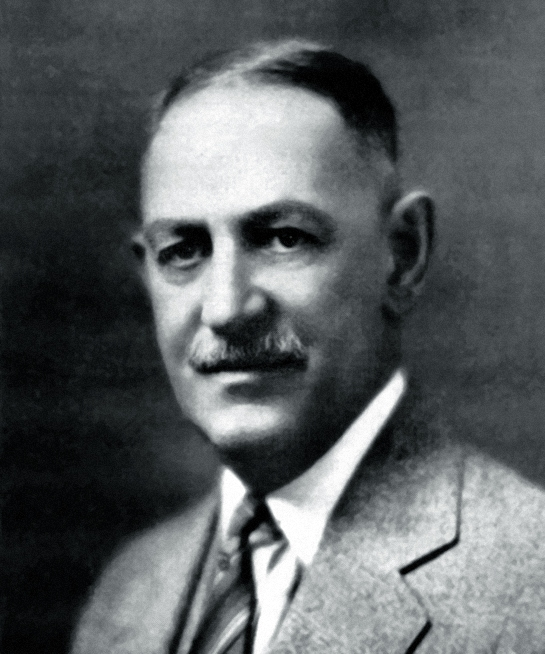
L.W. Hoffecker

Once the authorizing legislation was enacted, Hoffecker and Rovelstad came to a new agreement. Hoffecker would advance the money for the new coins and pay for the die making and shipping costs, which were the committee's responsibility under the legislation. The coins would be sold at $1.50 each; Hoffecker would take 35 cents per coin as commission. The coins were to remain on sale through Hoffecker until January 1, 1937, or until they were sold out, whichever came first. The agreement provided that Hoffecker "use every ethical means known to him to push the sale of these coins". Coin dealer B. Max Mehl, in his 1937 pamphlet on commemorative coins, stated that he considered the price of $1.50 too high when there was an issue of 25,000 struck.

On July 1, 1936, Hoffecker sent 3,500 letters offering the new coins, which had not yet been struck, to people who were on his mailing list or had enquired. He claimed to have 7,000 orders already, and urged collectors not to delay. His bank offered to have the coins shipped there and to carry the coins as part of its cash on hand, which would allow him to pay for them as orders came in, but Hoffecker preferred to pay for the coins at the start. Hoffecker stated in letters that other coin dealers had offered to buy the entire issue, but he had declined. At this time, there was a boom in commemorative coins, and dealers were trying to get all the special issues they could.

The Philadelphia Mint shipped 24,990 coins (the authorized mintage less the first ten pieces, which Rovelstad had taken) to Hoffecker on October 7, 1936; they were received in El Paso four days later. Hoffecker wrote to Frank Duffield, editor of The Numismatist, stating that he had the envelopes for already-ordered pieces all prepared, and hoped to mail the last of them out by the evening of October 13; the editor commented, "This sounds like real service". Several hundred pieces had been ordered through banks in Elgin; they received several consignments and eventually sold over a thousand. The Elgin Watch Company purchased 100 coins.

By November 1936, 16,170 pieces had been sold. Only about 2,000 more were sold in the next four months; Hoffecker's statement for March 1937 shows 18,790 sold with an additional 330 on consignment to the First National Bank of Elgin. Rovelstad had received $8,680.00 and Hoffecker $6,576.50. At this point, discussion turned to what to do with the remaining pieces, some 5,620 (a few hundred pieces were given away or otherwise disposed of). Rovelstad agreed to allow the coin dealer to purchase 250 pieces at $1 each; he was still selling them in 1948. Other dealers were uninterested in large purchases as the direct sale to collectors meant that few who wanted and could afford the Elgin coin lacked it. With demand at a standstill, Hoffecker feared that the remaining pieces would wind up in the hands of speculators. Five thousand pieces were returned to the Mint for melting.

== Aftermath and collecting ==
The Pioneer Family Memorial, on the east bank of the Fox River, near the Kimball Street Bridge, in Elgin, Illinois.

Rovelstad used the profits from the half dollar to continue work on his statuary group. He sought direct funding from the federal government in 1938 and from the Illinois Legislature the following year; both attempts failed. Through the half century that followed, he progressed on the statues, and by the time of his death in 1990, he had completed the group in plaster of Paris, that still needed to be bronzed before display. Shortly before his death, he told his wife, "I've lived a full life and have no regrets. The Pioneer Memorial is now completed. I've done all I could. Now it's up to others to see it erected. I can do no more." Rovelstad's tenant, Steve Youngren, established a foundation to raise money to complete the project. It raised $456,000, exceeding the actual cost by nearly ten percent, and the memorial was completed and dedicated in 2001.

Hoffecker served as president of the ANA from 1939 to 1941; he died January 13, 1955, at the age of 86. According to the 2014 edition of R.S. Yeoman's A Guide Book of United States Coins, the Elgin Centennial half dollar lists at $250 in Almost Uncirculated (AU-50) condition, rising to $550 in near-pristine MS-66. According to numismatic historian Q. David Bowers, "nothing untoward was associated with the distribution of the Elgin Centennial half dollars, and certainly at the Illinois end of the deal sculptor Trygve A. Rovelstad's intentions and ethics were of the highest order. L.W. Hoffecker distributed the pieces in a skillfully orchestrated publicity campaign and did as well as anyone could have done at the time."

== Notes and references ==
=== References cited ===
Books

- Mehl, B. Max (1937). The Commemorative Coinage of the United States. Fort Worth, Tx.: B. Max Mehl.
- Slabaugh, Arlie R. (1975). United States Commemorative Coinage (second ed.). Racine, Wis.: Whitman Publishing (then a division of Western Publishing Company, Inc.). ISBN 978-0-307-09377-6.
- Swiatek, Anthony (2012). Encyclopedia of the Commemorative Coins of the United States. Chicago: KWS Publishers. ISBN 978-0-9817736-7-4.
- Swiatek, Anthony; Breen, Walter (1981). The Encyclopedia of United States Silver & Gold Commemorative Coins, 1892 to 1954. New York: Arco Publishing. ISBN 978-0-668-04765-4.
- Taxay, Don (1967). An Illustrated History of U.S. Commemorative Coinage. New York: Arco Publishing. ISBN 978-0-668-01536-3.
- Vermeule, Cornelius (1971). Numismatic Art in America. Cambridge, Mass.: The Belknap Press of Harvard University Press. ISBN 978-0-674-62840-3.
- Yeoman, R.S. (2013). A Guide Book of United States Coins 2014 (67th ed.). Atlanta, Ga.: Whitman Publishing LLC. ISBN 978-0-7948-4180-5.

Other sources

- "ANA Presidents". American Numismatic Association. Archived from the original on July 2, 2013.
- Bowers, Q. David. "Chapter 8: Silver commemoratives (and clad too), Part 118". Commemorative Coins of the United States: A Complete Encyclopedia.
- Bowers, Q. David. "Chapter 8: Silver commemoratives (and clad too), Part 119". Commemorative Coins of the United States: A Complete Encyclopedia.
- Bowers, Q. David. "Chapter 8: Silver commemoratives (and clad too), Part 120". Commemorative Coins of the United States: A Complete Encyclopedia.
- Bowers, Q. David. "Chapter 8: Silver commemoratives (and clad too), Part 121". Commemorative Coins of the United States: A Complete Encyclopedia.
- Bowers, Q. David. "Chapter 8: Silver commemoratives (and clad too), Part 122". Commemorative Coins of the United States: A Complete Encyclopedia.
- Bowers, Q. David. "Chapter 8: Silver commemoratives (and clad too), Part 123". Commemorative Coins of the United States: A Complete Encyclopedia.
- Bowers, Q. David. "Chapter 8: Silver commemoratives (and clad too), Part 124". Commemorative Coins of the United States: A Complete Encyclopedia.
- Bowers, Q. David (February 1992). "A Tale of Two Commemoratives". The Numismatist. Colorado Springs, Col.: American Numismatic Association: 215–219.
- Ferrarin, Elena (November 12, 2011). "Elgin residents gather to celebrate memorial". [Arlington Heights, Illinois] Daily Herald.
- "L.W. Hoffecker". Numismatic Scrapbook Magazine. Chicago: Hewitt Bros.: 309 March 1955.
- "Elgin Illinois Centennial Half Dollar Legislation" (PDF). United States Mint. Archived from the original (PDF) on March 18, 2014.
