= Trygve Rovelstad =

American sculptor (1903–1990)

Trygve A. Rovelstad
- Born: September 27, 1903; Elgin, Illinois, U.S.
- Died: June 8, 1990 (aged 86); Elgin, Illinois, U.S.
- Known for: Sculpture and medal design

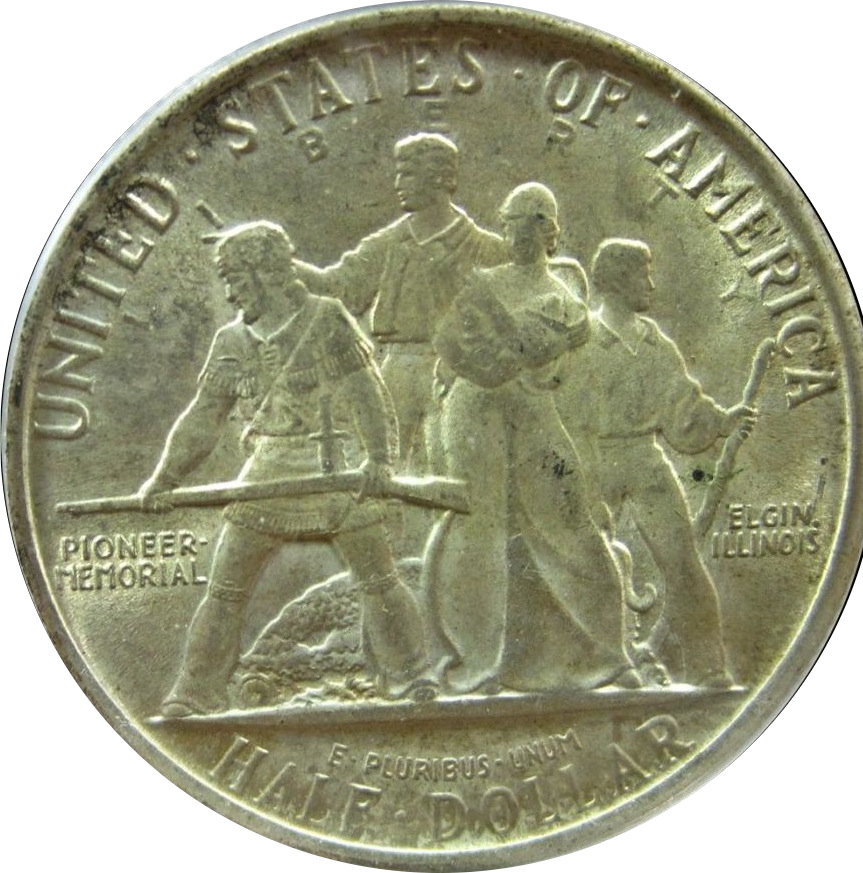
1936 Elgin Centennial half dollar

Trygve A. Rovelstad (September 27, 1903 – June 8, 1990) was an American sculptor and medal designer.

== Biography ==
Trygve A. Rovelstad was born in Elgin, Illinois, to Norwegian immigrant parents. Rovelstad first studied at Fabyan Villa art studio on the estate of George Fabyan in Geneva, Illinois. Later he was accepted to work and study at the studio of sculptor Lorado Taft. He also attended classes at the Art Institute of Chicago and at Beaux-Arts Institute of Design in New York City.

Rovelstad designed medals for the United States War Department, including the Combat Infantryman Badge, Legion of Merit, Bronze Star, Occupation of Germany Medal (General John J. Pershing Medal), Unit Blue Citation Badge, Women's Army Corps (WACs) Medal and Insignia Lapel Pins, and the E-Medal. He also designed non-military coins and medals for the United States Mint, the State of Illinois, and other bodies.

He was a lifelong resident of Elgin and created several works honoring the city's history. Several of his sculptures are displayed at the Elgin Area Historical Society Museum. His public sculptures include the Pioneer Family Memorial on the east bank of the Fox River and a bust of James Talcott Gifford (1800–1850), founder of Elgin.

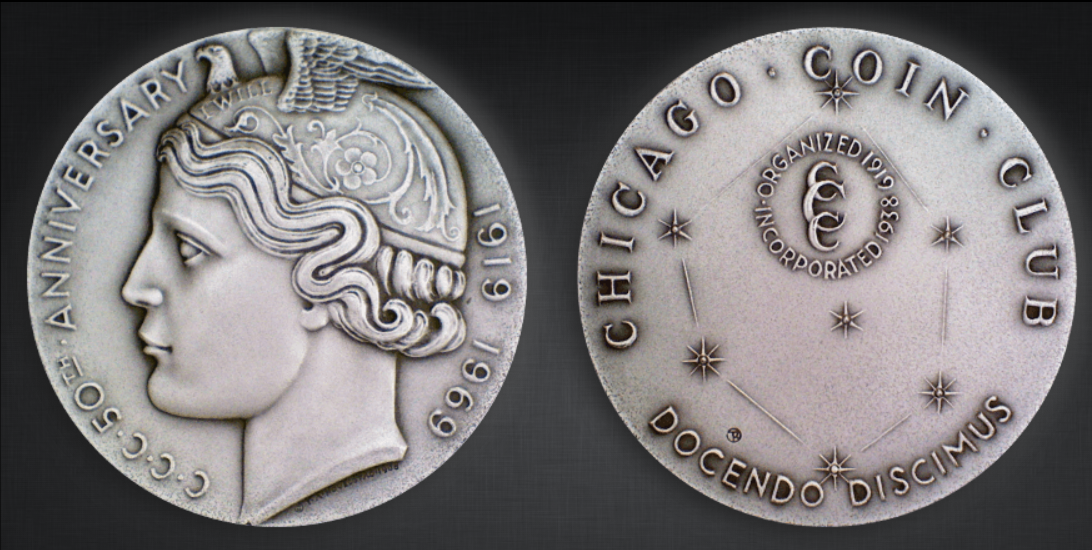
1969 Chicago Coin Club Semicentennial Medal

== Commemorative coin ==
In 1936, the commemorative Elgin Centennial half dollar designed by Rovelstad was issued by the United States Mint. Commemorating the centennial of Elgin, Illinois, the obverse features the profile of a pioneer with the dates "1673 * 1936," while the reverse features a pioneer family (four adults and a baby in its mother's arms). The coin was issued to finance the construction of Trygve Rovelstad's Pioneer Family Memorial.
