= Q. David Bowers =

American numismatist and writer (born 1938)

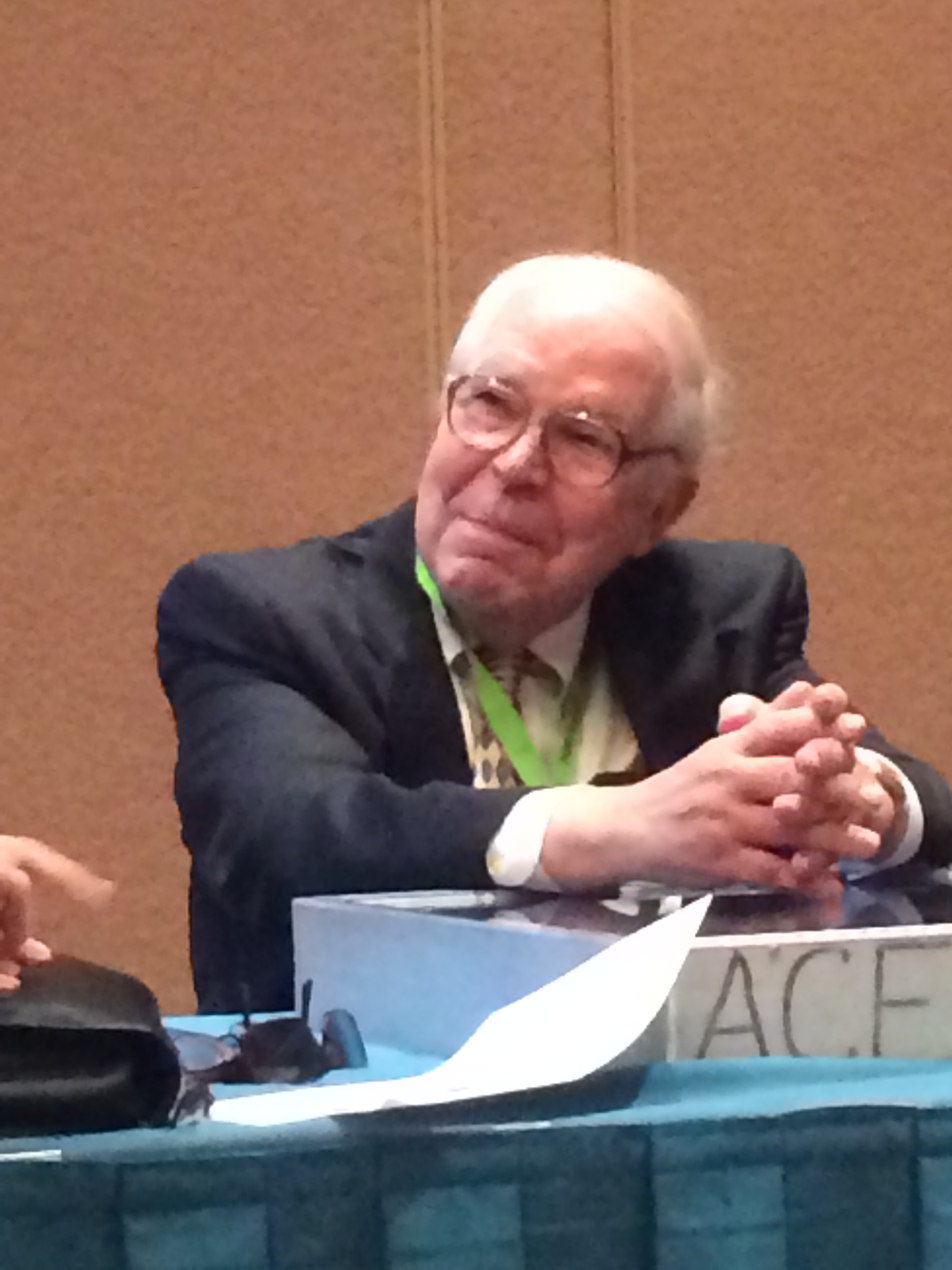
- Bowers in 2014
- Born: Quentin David Bowers; October 21, 1938 (age 88); Honesdale, Pennsylvania, U.S.
- Occupations: Numismatist, businessman, author, and columnist
- Years active: 1953-present

Quentin David Bowers (born October 21, 1938) is an American numismatist, businessman, author, and columnist. Beginning in 1952, Bowers’s contributions to numismatics have continued uninterrupted and unabated to the present day. He has been involved in the selling of rare coins since 1953 when he was a teenager.

During his career, he has written over 70 books and thousands of articles and catalogued and sold many of prominent collections.

== Early life ==
Bowers was born in Honesdale, Pennsylvania, in 1938. His maternal grandfather, Chester Garratt, an attorney by profession, was a hobbyist and researcher in many areas. Garratt gave him his first "rare" coin, a well worn 1893 Columbian half dollar. This would be his first exposure to numismatics.

In 1945–46, his next exposure to numismatics was a friend’s home in which a dozen or more Indian Head cents were embedded face-up in a concrete walk near the front door. In 1948, his family moved to Forty Fort, Pennsylvania.

As a 13-year-old high school student, Bowers's interests included reptiles, scouting, short-wave radio, Strombecker kit models of World War II airplanes, and rocks and minerals. During this time Bowers became interested in the written word. He received Raymond L. Ditmars' Reptiles of North America from his mother as a Christmas gift in 1952. According to Bowers, Ditmars, who was curator of reptiles at the New York Zoological Garden (Bronx Zoo), had a way of making just about anything sound fascinating. From such experiences, Bowers learned the power of the written word and how it can spur one to a great enthusiasm for acquisition.

He graduated from Pennsylvania State University in 1960, and was given the Alumni Achievement Award by that institution's College of Business Administration in a ceremony in 1976.

== Interest in numismatics ==
Robert L. Rusbar, a local tax collector, had a collection of rocks and minerals, and Bowers visited him. After a session with rocks and minerals, Rusbar asked Bowers if he collected coins, to which he replied in the negative. Rusbar presented a small green-covered album of Lincoln cents, pointed to one of the first openings, and showed that he had paid $10 for that particular coin. He carefully explained that it was a Lincoln cent made in the first year of issue, 1909, with the initials of the designer, Victor David Brenner, V.D.B., on the reverse. Bowers would soon discover that the reason for the high value was that beneath the date, there was a tiny "S" signifying it had been made in San Francisco. This mint mark jumped the value from a few cents up to the $10 he had paid. Bowers discovered that 484,000 had been minted and became inspired to find one himself. Rusbar would give Bowers a couple of blue Whitman coin folders and a few mintmarked Lincoln cents to get started. Inspired with the idea of making money by selling coins, rather than cutting grass, Bowers traded a $10 bill for 1,000 mixed Lincoln cents. Bowers's goal was to find the 1909-S VDB, 1914-D, and 1931-S pieces.

From finding Lincoln cents in circulation, Bowers moved towards other series, including Mercury dimes and Standing Liberty quarters. Seeking to gain more knowledge, Bowers discovered the Numismatic Scrapbook Magazine, a monthly journal put out by brothers Lee and Cliff Hewitt in Illinois. The dozens of pages were filled with stories and tales about coins and coin collecting, but advertisements offering things for sale were a catalyst in stimulating Bowers's affinity for coins. The first coin Bowers ever ordered through the mail was an Indian cent, an 1859 proof at a price of $11 from the Copley Coin Company run by Maurice Gould and Frank Washburn in Boston. His enthusiasm for the Numismatic Scrapbook Magazine also resulted in an accumulation of back copies dating to 1935, and a file of several decades of The Numismatist. A local insurance agent, George P. Williams, would take Bowers under his wing. Together, they would attend meetings of the Wilkes-Barre Coin Club held in the YMCA.

Bowers became a vest-pocket dealer in 1953, when he was not quite 15 years of age. He had begun collecting coins just a few months earlier, and he found he had an aptitude for buying and selling them advantageously. Bowers would start running advertisements in the classified section of the local paper seeking coins. As his growing dealership prospered, so would his capital. He would buy coins locally from the public and from other collectors and then sell them at the coin club and to collectors he met there. In the early years, becoming a dealer had its challenges as there were no guides to use as a reference. One of the risks included the authenticity of a coin, while another point of tension was condition. As there were no published standards, what one person called Gem Uncirculated could be what another might call About Uncirculated. Bowers attended his first ANA convention in 1955, and joined the ANA in 1956, when he turned 18, the youngest age the Association would accept at that time.

By his senior year in high school, his business was flourishing, and coin dealing had become the young entrepreneur's principal extracurricular activity. Academically, he excelled as well. He was a finalist in the first National Merit Scholarship competition in 1956, and he won further academic distinction at Penn State University, graduating with honors in 1960.

In 1958, while still in college, Bowers teamed up with James F. Ruddy — the first of several partners to figure in his career — to form the Empire Coin Co. in Johnson City, New York. The company rode the crest of the mail-order boom in the early 1960s to become one of the nation's leading coin dealerships. Bowers was a co-founder of the Token and Medal Society in November 1960. In 1965, Paramount International Coin Corp. acquired Empire. Bowers left the coin business to indulge in one of his other great passions: automatic musical instruments.

== Numismatic legacy ==
Bowers's work with rare coins has led to COINage magazine naming him as one of the Numismatists of the Century. Bowers's dedication to the hobby and his lifelong interest in rare coins, along with his pursuit of scholarly knowledge, have made him one of the most honored and revered numismatists of all time. Bowers is the only person to have served as president of both the Professional Numismatists Guild (1977–1979) and the American Numismatic Association (1983–1985). From the PNG, he received their highest honor, the Founders Award; and he has received their Friedberg Award a record seven times. From the ANA, Bowers has received its two most distinguished awards: Numismatist of the Year and the Farran Zerbe Memorial Award.

Bowers was the first ANA member to be named Numismatist of the Year (1995), has been inducted into the Numismatic Hall of Fame (at the ANA Headquarters in Colorado Springs), and has received more Book of the Year Award and Best Columnist honors given by the Numismatic Literary Guild than any other writer. He has lectured at Harvard University and appeared on the Today Show as well as on programs on CNN, CBS, ABC, NBC, Fox, the Discovery Channel and the History Channel.

The Q. David Bowers Collection of Chinese coins was sold in 2018: The Q. David Bowers Collection of Chinese Coins in Copper - sale in Hong Kong, 2 April 2018.

In 2010, the American Numismatic Association named one of their Young Numismatist Literary Awards after Bowers, where articles submitted by children ages 13-17 can win awards and numismatic books.

Since 2021, Bowers has been named one of Coin World's Top 10 Most Influential People in Numismatics four consecutive years. He celebrated his Platinum (70th) anniversary as an ANA member in 2026.

== Literary career ==
Bowers is the author of over three dozen books on various historical subjects, including the following:

- Muriel Ostriche: Princess of Silent Films, (1987) ISBN 0-911572-64-3
- Nickelodeon Theatres and Their Music, (1999) ISBN 0-911572-50-3
- The History of U.S. Coinage (for Johns Hopkins University)
- The Encyclopedia of Automatic Musical Instruments, Vestal Press (1973)
- Thanhouser Films: An Encyclopedia and History, Thanhouser Company Film Preservation (1997)

He has authored other works which have become standard references in their fields.

He is highly regarded as a very prolific numismatic author too, having produced 50 works, mostly written in the field of rare coins, including the following:

- American Numismatic Association Centennial History, Bowers & Merena Galleries, Incorporated (August 1, 1991) ISBN 0-943161-29-0
- Adventures with Rare Coins, Bowers & Ruddy Galleries (March 1996) ISBN 0-914490-00-1
- Silver Dollars and Trade Dollars of the United States (two volumes) Bowers & Merena Galleries, Incorporated (July 1993) ISBN 0-943161-48-7
- A California Gold Rush History He has also written hundreds of auction and other catalogues, and several thousand articles.

Bowers has served as Numismatic Director of Whitman Publishing LLC since 2003, where he has produced another group of books including the Bowers Series covering various coin types in detail.

From 1976-2021, Bowers wrote a column, "The Joys of Collecting", for Coin World in both the magazine's weekly and monthly issues. From 2018-2021, Bowers wrote a weekly column called "Bowers On Collecting" for Coin Update News and Mint News Blog. The column went into re-runs following his retirement, and its previous articles are archived on The E-Sylum, an online forum run by the Numismatic Bibliomania Society.

Bowers also had a column called "Coins and Collectors" in The Numismatist, the monthly magazine of the American Numismatic Association, from 1965-2021. He was a frequent contributor to The Commemorative Trail, the newsletter of the Society for U.S. Commemorative Coins, during its run.

== Other work ==
Bowers's interest in cinema history dates from August 1957, when on a visit to Philadelphia's Pine Street district of antiques shops he purchased a collection of one-sheet Biograph, Vitagraph, and other silent film posters which had been deaccessioned by Harvard University and sold to a dealer in old prints. Since then he has built an archive of cinema periodicals and publications, including many items formerly the property of George Kleine, Martin Quigley, William Fox, and other notables in the industry.

== Business ==
Bowers was the Co-Chairman of Stack's, a company that endeavors in rare numismatics auctions and is now known as Stack's Bowers Galleries. During his career, he has catalogued and sold at public auction many of the finest and most valuable and important collections ever assembled. They include:

- the Louis E. Eliasberg Sr. Collection, the only complete United States coin collection ever brought together
- the Harry W. Bass Jr. Collection
- the Ambassador and Mrs. R. Henry Norweb Collection
- the John Work Garrett Collection sold by order of The Johns Hopkins University
- the Childs Collection, the highlight of which was the finest known 1804 silver dollar, at the time the second—and as of April 2017 the fifth—most valuable coin ever auctioned.

On July 29, 2025, Stack's Bowers Galleries announced Bowers had retired from the company.

== Personal life ==
Bowers was married to Mary Masters from 1960–73, and they had two children. Since 1978 he has been married to Christine Valentine.
