= Royal Canadian Numismatic Association medals and awards =

By 1954, a new trend was beginning to emerge for the Royal Canadian Numismatic Association as annual meetings evolved into annual conventions. Working with the Toronto Coin Club as host, the first such convention was held in Toronto in 1954. The conventions offered an agenda of educational forums, bourse activity, competitive exhibits with awards to the winners, and a closing banquet, with the highlight being a special guest speaker. . It was also in 1954 that the association issued its first ever medal to commemorate the event. The tradition of an annual convention and a convention medal continues to this very day.

The Canadian Numismatic Association's official seal would eventually be used on many convention medals. The seal is an adaptation of Emmanuel Hahn's famous “Voyageur” design, which was used on Canadian Silver Dollars since 1935. The first year that this seal was eventually used was 1963. The original die was engraved by H.F. Sarson of Pressed Metal Products in Vancouver.

The Royal Canadian Numismatic Association's official seal would be used beginning with the 2009 convention medal, following the official name change of the organization in 2008.

== Annual Convention Medals ==
Since 1954, the Royal Canadian Numismatic Association has sponsored the striking of a convention medal as a way of commemorating the occasion. The concept was that these medals would be for those attending the event. Eventually, variations were used as awards for those competing in the many convention display exhibits. The annual convention was directed by a host club. Occasionally, the members of the club were responsible for the designing of the medal. The mintages have varied from year to year as the mintage is determined by the host club. The contributing factors will include projected attendance, the economic climate and location of the convention. Consequently, mintages for the medals vary from year to year.

== 1954 CNA Annual Convention ==
The inaugural CNA Convention was held at Toronto’s King Edward Hotel on August 23 and 24, 1954. The Toronto Coin Club hosted the occasion and the guest speaker was Peter Seaby of London, England. To commemorate the event, a medal was issued for the attendees of the convention. The designer was P.S. Favro and it was struck with the participation of the H. Barnard Stamp & Stencil Company, from Hamilton, Ontario. Eventually, the dies were turned over to the Toronto Coin Club and given to the Royal Canadian Numismatic Association on permanent loan in 1981.

Specifications	Medal	Award
Catalogue No.	CNA-1	CNA-1A
Composition	Brass	Silver
Finish	Bright	Bright
Weight	11.1 grams	13.5 grams
Shape	Circular	Circular
Diameter	32.1 mm	32.5 mm
Die Axis	Upright	Upright
Edge	Plain	Plain
Issue Price	$1.00	See Note 1
Mintage	200	2

- NOTE 1: The silver version was a duplicate of the brass version. It was presented as an award in November 1954 to P.S. Favro. The award acknowledged his work on the Convention. A second version exists as well.
- ALTERNATE VERSIONS: In 1962, the medallion was restruck in Sterling Silver. This was to acknowledge the 26th Anniversary of the Toronto Coin Club and were sold for $6.00 each. A total of 50 were minted, followed by another 12 in 1967. A brass version was produced in 1967. There were a total of 300 medals that were struck and these are denoted by the letter R that is stamped on the reverse between 1954 and Toronto. The issue price was $3.00 each.

== 1955 CNA Annual Convention ==
The second CNA Convention was held at Ottawa's Chateau Laurier Hotel on September 5 and 6, 1955. The guest speaker was A.P. Williams, the Master of the Royal Canadian Mint. Pritchard-Andrews Co., based out of Ottawa, struck the medal. The obverse die featured the old arms from the City of Ottawa and had been previously used by Pritchard-Andrews for various commemorative medals. Pritchard-Andrews retained the design once more for the CNA's medal. The reverse die has been lost but featured the wording: “Canadian Numismatic Association – Chapter No. 1 - Ottawa Host to Convention – Sept 7 & 8, 1955.” Regrettably, the medals were struck from clashed dies and a cracked obverse die.

Specifications	Medal
Catalogue No.	CNA-2
Composition	Brass
Finish	Bright
Weight	23.4 grams
Shape	Circular
Diameter	39.2 mm
Die Axis	Upright
Edge	Plain
Issue Price	$1.00
Mintage	208

== 1956 CNA Annual Convention ==
The third CNA Convention was held in London, Ontario on September 21 and 22, 1956. Birks Jewellers designed and struck the official convention medals, although the dies were destroyed in 1973. The medal was of octagonal shape and featured the arms of the city of London. In later years, the obverse die was used to strike bronze medals that commemorated the 100th meeting (in 1959) and the 250th meeting (in 1971) of the London Numismatic Society.

Specifications	Medal	Special Edition Medal
Catalogue No.	CNA-3	CNA-3A
Composition	Brass	Sterling Silver
Finish	Antique	Antique
Weight	10.8 grams	11.1 grams
Shape	Octagonal	Octagonal
Diameter	31.0 mm	31.0 mm
Die Axis	Upright	Upright
Edge	Chamfered	Chamfered
Issue Price	$1.00	$3.50
Mintage	125	25

== 1957 CNA Annual Convention ==
The fourth CNA Convention was held in Hamilton, Ontario on August 30 and 31, 1957. The Hamilton Coin Club hosted the event. The guest speaker was J.D. Ferguson, and recounted “Memories of Fifty Years in Numismatics.” The obverse of the medal displays the host city's coat of arms.

Specifications	Medal
Catalogue No.	CNA-4
Composition	Brass
Finish	Antique
Weight	19.6 grams
Shape	Circular
Diameter	36.6 mm
Die Axis	Upright
Edge	Plain, impressed BIRKS
Issue Price	$2.50
Mintage	200

NOTE: Two Sterling Silver versions were created as awards. They had an antique finish with the words BIRKS/STERLING impressed on the edge. It weighed 21.7 grams, was specially cased, and one was presented to J.D. Ferguson.

== 1958 CNA Annual Convention ==
The fifth CNA Convention was held in Ottawa, Ontario from September 4 to 6, 1958. The Ottawa Coin Club hosted the event. The guest speaker was Harold Don Allen. The obverse of the Convention medal featured the new heraldic arms of the City of Ottawa, as designed by Lt.-Cmdr Allan Beddoe. The medal was designed and struck by Birks Jewellers of Ottawa. Like the 1956 Convention dies, the 1958 dies were destroyed too. The medal also commemorates the Centenary of the establishment of decimal coinage in Canada and the 50th year of operation of the Royal Canadian Mint.

Specifications	Medal
Catalogue No.	CNA-5
Composition	Brass
Finish	Antique
Weight	19.8 grams
Shape	Circular
Diameter	36.6 mm
Die Axis	Upright
Edge	Plain, impressed BIRKS
Issue Price	$2.00
Mintage	300

== 1959 CNA Annual Convention ==
The 1959 CNA Annual Convention marked the first time that it was held outside of Ontario. It was held in Regina, Saskatchewan at the Hotel Saskatchewan from September 2 to 4, 1959. Mr. J. Douglas Ferguson was the guest speaker. Mr. Cec Tannahill and Mr. J.C. Summerlin designed the scalloped shaped medal. Birks Montreal then struck the medal, and Birks destroyed the dies after the medals were produced.

Specifications	Medal	Special Edition Medal	Gold-Filled Medal
Catalogue No.	CNA-6	CNA-6A	CNA-6B
Composition	Brass	Sterling Silver	Gold-Filled Bronze
Finish	Antique	Antique	Antique
Weight	15.5 grams	18.0 grams	15.3 grams
Shape	Scalloped	Scalloped	Scalloped
Diameter	37.8 mm	37.8 mm	37.8 mm
Die Axis	Upright	Upright	Upright
Edge	Rounded	Rounded	Rounded
Issue Price	$2.50	$7.50	$14.50
Mintage	275	30	30

== 1960 CNA Annual Convention ==
The seventh annual event was held in Sherbrooke, Québec from August 18 to the 20 at the New Sherbrooke Hotel. The guest speaker was Major Sheldon S. Carroll and the medal that was presented was larger than in previous years. The medal was in the form of a plaquette with a wooden mount and the design was an adaptation of the Habitant penny of 1852 with suitable convention legends. Canadian Artistic Dies Ltd. of Sherbrooke struck the medal. The medal was struck from a die engraved by O. Lombardo.

Specifications	Medal	Special Edition Medal	Gold-Filled Medal
Catalogue No.	CNA-7	CNA-7A	CNA-7B
Composition	Brass	Sterling Silver	Gold-Filled Bronze
Finish	Antique	Antique	Antique
Weight	60.6 grams	75.0 grams	62.0 grams
Shape	Plaquette	Plaquette	Plaquette
Diameter	45.4 x 62.4 mm	45.4 x 62.4 mm	45.4 x 62.4 mm
Die Axis	Upright	Upright	Upright
Edge	Plain	Plain	Plain
Issue Price	$2.75	$10.00	$15.00
Mintage	289	48	18

NOTE: There were actually 20 of the gold-filled bronze that were issued. Two were used as special awards to J.D. Ferguson and Cecil Tannahill. With regards to the bronze version (CNA-7), 300 were actually minted but 11 were used as competition awards. The Best Exhibit Award went to J.D. Ferguson. Two versions of the medal exist in lead but they were minted as trial strikes. .

== 1961 CNA Annual Convention ==
The eighth annual convention was held at Hamilton's Royal Connaught Hotel, Ontario from August 31 through September 2. The host club was the Hamilton Coin Club and the banquet speaker was former American Numismatic Association president Admiral O.H. Dodson. The obverse of the medal showed the Hamilton City Hall and adjoining grounds. The medal was designed by S.M. Roscoe, who was also the architect of the Hamilton City Hall.

Specifications	Medal	Special Edition Medal	Gold-Filled Medal
Catalogue No.	CNA-8	CNA-8A	CNA-8B
Composition	Brass	Sterling Silver	Gold-Filled Bronze
Finish	Antique	Antique	Antique
Weight	19.5 grams	22.3 grams	18.9 grams
Shape	Circular	Circular	Circular
Diameter	36.6 mm	36.6 mm	36.6 mm
Die Axis	Upright	Upright	Upright
Edge	Plain, impressed BIRKS	Plain, impressed BIRKS STERLING	Plain, impressed BIRKS GF
Issue Price	$3.00	$7.50	$25.00
Mintage	810	70	35

== 1962 CNA Annual Convention ==
The ninth annual convention marked the first and only time that the C.N.A. held its convention outside of Canada. In conjunction with the American Numismatic Association, the Convention took place at Detroit's Sheridan-Cadillac Hotel from August 15 to 18, 1962. The Detroit Coin Club hosted the event. The Convention medal was designed by Marshall M. Fredericks, a noted Detroit sculptor. The obverse depicts a device, half maple leaf and half eagle, symbolic of the two associations. The reverse depicts the “Spirit of Detroit”, a sculpture by Mr. Fredericks.

Specifications	Medal	Special Edition Medal
Catalogue No.	CNA-9	CNA-9A
Composition	Pale Bronze	Silver
Finish	Antique	Antique
Weight	41.5 grams	49.2 grams
Shape	Circular	Circular
Diameter	41.3 mm	41.2 mm
Die Axis	Upright	Upright
Edge	Plain, stamped, MEDALLIC ART CO. NY, serially numbered	Plain, stamped, MEDALLIC ART CO. NY, .999 PURE SILVER, serially numbered
Issue Price	$2.50	$9.00
Mintage	1200	1000

== 1963 CNA Annual Convention ==
The tenth annual convention was hosted by the Vancouver Numismatic Society in Vancouver, British Columbia. The Convention took place from August 15 to 17, 1963. For the first time ever, the C.N.A.’s official seal was incorporated into the design. The C.N.A. seal is an adaptation of Emanuel Hahn’s Voyageur Dollar reverse design. The reverse depicts a view of “The Lions”, twin mountain peaks of the North Shore coastal range, with the Lion's Gate Suspension bridge in the foreground. The medal was designed by Larry Gingras, Leslie C. Hill, and Lawrence Kristmanson. It was struck by Pressed Metal Products of Vancouver.

Specifications	Medal	Special Edition Medal
Catalogue No.	CNA-10	CNA-10A
Composition	Copper	Sterling Silver
Finish	Antique	Antique
Weight	32.3 grams	35.2 grams
Shape	Circular	Circular
Diameter	38.8 mm	38.8 mm
Die Axis	Upright	Upright
Edge	Plain	Plain
Issue Price	$3.50	$5.00
Mintage	700	181

== 1964 CNA Annual Convention ==
The eleventh annual convention marked was held in Halifax, Nova Scotia. The Halifax Coin Club hosted the event and the Convention took place from August 27 to 29. The obverse of the official Convention medal offers a view of the Old Town Clock on Citadel Hill. The reverse, showing the flag of Nova Scotia was designed by A.M. MacDonald. Benjamin Ireland cut the dies and Wellings of Toronto struck the medals.

Specifications	Medal	Special Edition Medal
Catalogue No.	CNA-11	CNA-11A
Composition	Bronze	Fine Silver
Finish	Antique	Bright
Weight	35.6 grams	50.4 grams
Shape	Circular	Circular
Diameter	40.5 mm	40.5 mm
Die Axis	Upright	Upright
Edge	Plain	Plain, serially numbered
Issue Price	$2.75	$8.00
Mintage	700	181

== 1965 CNA Annual Convention ==
The twelfth annual convention was held in Montreal. The Montreal Numismatic Society was the host club for the Convention, which took place from August 12 to 14. J.D. Ferguson was a guest speaker at the banquet. The obverse shows a view of downtown Montreal, with Mount Royal and the Cross in the background. The reverse presents a view of the Chateau de Ramezay, historic site of Canada's first numismatic society. The medal was designed by a committee led by Robert Verity. The medal was struck by William Scully Ltd of Montreal. In later years, the Scully presses and dies were acquired by Wellings of Toronto and the dies were destroyed in 1973.

Specifications	Medal	Special Edition Medal
Catalogue No.	CNA-12	CNA-12A
Composition	Bronze	Sterling Silver
Finish	Antique	Antique
Weight	37.8 grams	47.4 grams
Shape	Circular	Circular
Diameter	44.5 mm	44.5 mm
Die Axis	Upright	Upright
Edge	Plain, some impressed “SCULLY LTD”	Plain, impressed “SCULLY LTD”
Issue Price	$2.50	$6.50
Mintage	1187	287

== 1966 CNA Annual Convention ==
The thirteenth annual convention was held in Winnipeg, Manitoba. It marked the first time that the Convention was held in Manitoba. The Manitoba Coin Club was the host club for the Convention. It was held at the Marlborough Hotel from August 25 to 27. The guest speaker at the banquet was Major Sheldon S. Carroll. The obverse depicts the arms of the province of Manitoba and the reverse presents a view of Lower Fort Garry. The dies were cut by Benjamin Ireland and the medals were struck by Wellings Mfg. of Toronto. Once again, the dies were destroyed in 1973.

Specifications	Medal	Special Edition Medal
Catalogue No.	CNA-13	CNA-13A
Composition	Bronze	Sterling Silver
Finish	Antique	Antique
Weight	25.9 grams	41.8 grams
Shape	Circular	Circular
Diameter	40.6 mm	40.6 mm
Die Axis	Upright	Upright
Edge	Plain	Plain, serially numbered
Issue Price	$2.50	$8.00
Mintage	500	113

== 1967 CNA Annual Convention ==
The fourteenth annual convention was held in Ottawa, Ontario. This marked Canada's Centennial Year and the Ottawa Coin Club and Capital City Coin Clubs both hosted the event. The dates of the event were from August 31 to September 2. It was held at Chateau Laurier Hotel and the guest speaker at the banquet was Dr. V. Clain-Stefanelli, Curator of Numismatics at the U.S. National Museum in Washington, DC. The obverse depicts the Canadian Numismatic Association's emblem while the reverse showed a view of the Canadian Parliament Buildings, as seen from across the Ottawa River at Nepean Point. The medal was designed by O. Lombardo and then struck by Canadian Artistic Dies of Sherbrooke, Québec. The medals were struck by Canadian Artistic Dies of Sherbrooke. The dies are in the C.N.A. archives.

Specifications	Medal	Special Edition Medal
Catalogue No.	CNA-14	CNA-14A
Composition	Bronze	Antique Silver
Finish	Antique	Antique
Weight	26.4 grams	32.5 grams
Shape	Circular	Circular
Diameter	38.4 mm	38.4 mm
Die Axis	Upright	Upright
Edge	Plain	Plain
Issue Price	$3.50	N/A
Mintage	1000	40

== 1968 CNA Annual Convention ==
The fifteenth annual convention was held in Calgary, Alberta. The Calgary Coin Association hosted the event. The dates of the event were from July 15 to July 17 at the Hotel Palliser. The obverse depicts an Indian on horseback, shooting a buffalo with a bow and arrow. The scene was adapted from a painting by Paul Kane from 1849. The reverse depicts a racing chuckwagon which was designed by D.M. Stewart and Doug Van Galen. Canadian Artistic Dies of Sherbrooke cut the dies and produced the medals.

Specifications	Medal	Special Edition Medal
Catalogue No.	CNA-15	CNA-15A
Composition	Bronze	Silver
Finish	Antique	Antique
Weight	32.7 grams	27.9 grams
Shape	Circular	Circular
Diameter	38.8 mm	38.8 mm
Die Axis	Upright	Upright
Edge	Plain	Plain
Issue Price	$3.50	N/A
Mintage	1000	40

== 1969 CNA Annual Convention ==
The sixteenth annual convention was held in Toronto, Ontario. The Toronto Coin Club hosted the event from August 28 to August 30. The banquet speaker was Ernest F. Brown, Acting Master of the Royal Canadian Mint. This was the convention where the J. Douglas Ferguson gold medal was inaugurated and the first recipient was Fred Bowman. The medal was an irregular shaped medal and marked the fourth time that the convention had an irregular shaped medal. The other instances where irregular shaped medals were used were 1956, 1959, and 1960. The shape of the Toronto Convention medal was a pentagon. The obverse was designed by Roger Fox and David Ashe, and shows a view of the new Toronto City Hall. The reverse was designed by Hazel Munro. It has the badge of the Toronto Coin Club. Canadian Artistic Dies of Sherbrooke struck the medals. The dies are part of the C.N.A. archives.

Specifications	Medal	Special Edition Medal
Catalogue No.	CNA-16	CNA-16A
Composition	Bronze	Antique Silver
Finish	Antique	Antique
Weight	45.4 grams	62.2 grams
Shape	Pentagonal	Pentagonal
Diameter	47.2 mm x 49.6 mm	47.2 mm x 49.6 mm
Die Axis	Upright	Upright
Edge	Plain	Plain
Issue Price	$3.00	N/A
Mintage	980	25

== 1970 CNA Annual Convention ==
The seventeenth annual convention was held in Halifax, Nova Scotia. The Halifax Coin Club hosted the event from August 5 to August 8. The obverse was designed by A.M. MacDonald and Collins Baugild from a drawing by Cmdr. L.B. Jenson, R.C.N. (Ret.), who was also this year's Convention banquet speaker. The Convention medal's obverse shows the H.M.S. Shannon sailing to the right under full sail. The medal was struck by the Wellings Mint of Toronto. Both dies are in the Nova Scotia archives.

Specifications	Medal	Special Edition Medal
Catalogue No.	CNA-17	CNA-17A
Composition	Bronze	Silver
Finish	Antique	Antique
Weight	36.8 grams	34.2 grams
Shape	Circular	Circular
Diameter	40.4 mm	40.4 mm
Die Axis	Upright	Upright
Edge	Plain	Plain, numbered, stamped “Wellings, 999”
Issue Price	$3.00	$10.00
Mintage	500	151

== 1971 CNA Annual Convention ==
The eighteenth annual convention was held in Vancouver, British Columbia during British Columbia's Centennial Year. The Vancouver Numismatic Society hosted the event from August 26 to August 28. All 159 guests at the banquet received a special silver medal commemorating the event.

The obverse of the Convention Medal shows the device of the C.N.A. at left and the device of the Vancouver Numismatic Society at the right. The reverse shows the early seal of British Columbia at the left and the arms of British Columbia at the right. The design for the reverse was based on a suggestion by Leslie C. Hill. The obverse was suggested by William E. Perry. The dies and medals were struck by Frank Sarson of Pressed Metal Products of Vancouver. Both dies are in the C.N.A. archives.

Specifications	Medal	Special Edition Medal
Catalogue No.	CNA-18	CNA-18A
Composition	Bronze	Silver
Finish	Antique	Antique
Weight	22.3 grams	22.6 grams
Shape	Circular	Circular
Diameter	39.2 mm	39.2 mm
Die Axis	Upright	Upright
Edge	Plain	Plain, stamped “STERLING”, serially numbered
Issue Price	$4.00	$10.00
Mintage	427	121

== 1972 CNA Annual Convention ==
The nineteenth annual convention was held in Toronto, Ontario and was in conjunction with the Canadian Paper Money Society. The event was from August 2 to August 5. The year's Best of Show Exhibit winner was C.F. Rowe.

The obverse of the Convention Medal shows the device of the C.N.A. and the C.P.M.S. The reverse illustrates the coat of arms of the City of Toronto registered with the College of Arms, London, England. The obverse of the medal was designed by R.W. Irwin and the reverse by W. English. The medals were struck by the Lombardo Mint.

Specifications	Medal	Special Edition Medal
Catalogue No.	CNA-19	CNA-19A
Composition	Bronze	Silver
Finish	Antique	Bright
Weight	21.9 grams	25.8 grams
Shape	Circular	Circular
Diameter	38.5 mm	38.5 mm
Die Axis	Upright	Upright
Edge	Plain	Plain, numbered, stamped 999
Issue Price	$4.00	$10.00
Mintage	400	150

== 1983 CNA Annual Convention ==
The 30th Canadian Numismatic Association annual convention was held in Moncton, New Brunswick from July 20 to July 23, 1983.

The obverse of the Convention Medal shows the #66 locomotive, a 4-4-0 Type D-17. The reverse shows the early seal of British Columbia at the left and the arms of British Columbia at the right. The design for the reverse was based on the Voyageur dollar. The obverse was designed by Lloyd R. Carson, a retired CNR mechanical supervisor. These were the first medallions struck by the Royal Canadian Mint.

Specifications	Medal	Special Edition Medal
Charlton Catalogue #	CNA-30	CNA-30A
Composition	Bronze	Silver
Finish	Bright	Bright
Weight	31.3 grams	30.8 grams
Shape	Circular	Circular
Diameter	39.0 mm	39.0 mm
Die Axis	Upright	Upright
Edge	Plain	Plain
Issue Price	$10.00	$35.00
Mintage	200	100

== 1984 CNA Annual Convention ==
The 31st Canadian Numismatic Association annual convention was held in Hamilton, Ontario from July 19 to July 22, 1984.

The obverse of the Convention Medal has a theme for the United Empire Loyalists. The artists rendition was taken from a statue erected by the City of Hamilton as a tribute to the settlers that came and made a very positive impact in the surrounding area.

Specifications	Medal	Special Edition Medal
Charlton Catalogue #	CNA-31	CNA-31A
Composition	Bronze	Silver
Finish	Bright	Reverse Frosted
Weight	31.2 grams	30.0 grams
Shape	Circular	Circular
Diameter	38.9 mm	38.9 mm
Die Axis	Upright	Upright
Edge	Plain	Plain
Issue Price	$10.00	$35.00
Mintage	250	93

== 1985 CNA Annual Convention ==
The 32nd Canadian Numismatic Association annual convention was held in Regina, Saskatchewan from July 17 to July 21, 1985.

The theme for the obverse was the “Northcote at Batoche 9 May 1885.” The design features naval action, which was part of the Northwest Rebellion led by Louis Riel

Specifications	Medal	Special Edition Medal
Charlton Catalogue #	CNA-32	CNA-32A
Composition	Bronze	Silver
Finish	Bright	Reverse Frosted
Weight	31.3 grams	31.2 grams
Shape	Circular	Circular
Diameter	38.9 mm	38.9 mm
Die Axis	Upright	Upright
Edge	Plain	Plain
Issue Price	$10.00	$35.00
Mintage	375	175

== 1986 CNA annual convention ==
The 33rd Canadian Numismatic Association annual convention was held in Toronto, Ontario, from July 23 to July 26, 1986.

The theme for the reverse was the North York Memorial Community Hall.

Specifications	Medal	Special Edition Medal
Charlton Catalogue #	CNA-33	CNA-33A
Composition	Bronze	Silver
Finish	Bright	Reverse Frosted
Weight	31.2 grams	31.3 grams
Shape	Circular	Circular
Diameter	38.9 mm	38.9 mm
Die axis	Upright	Upright
Edge	Plain	Plain
Issue price	$12.50	$38.50
Mintage	250	100

== 1987 CNA annual convention ==
The 34th Canadian Numismatic Association annual convention was held in Calgary, Alberta, from July 14 to July 19, 1987.

The theme for the reverse was a grain elevator, an oil derrick, the Rocky Mountains, and the Calgary Tower.

Specifications	Medal	Special Edition Medal
Charlton Catalogue #	CNA-34	CNA-34A
Composition	Bronze	Silver
Finish	Bright	Reverse Frosted
Weight	31.5 grams	31.1 grams
Shape	Circular	Circular
Diameter	38.9 mm	38.9 mm
Die axis	Upright	Upright
Edge	Plain	Plain
Issue price	$12.50	$35.00
Mintage	250	100

== 1991 CNA Annual Convention ==
The 38th Canadian Numismatic Association annual convention was held in Toronto, Ontario from July 23 to July 28, 1985.

The obverse of the Convention Medal featured the skyline of Toronto. At the time, it was the most detailed object ever struck at the Royal Canadian Mint. Every line of its design was drawn by the Royal Canadian Mint's chief engraver Ago Aarand, with assistance by Stan Witten. It took over a week of painstaking detail to complete the thousands of lines in the 8" diameter sketch.

Specifications	Medal	Special Edition Medal
Charlton Catalogue #	CNA-38	CNA-38A
Composition	Bronze	Silver
Finish	Bright	Reverse Frosted
Weight	N/A	N/A
Shape	Circular	Circular
Diameter	N/A	N/A
Die Axis	Upright	Upright
Edge	Plain	Plain
Issue Price	$15.00	$40.00
Mintage	N/A	N/A

== The J.D. Ferguson Award ==
Year	Winner
1969	Fred Bowman
1970	Sheldon S. Carroll
1971	Guy R.L. Potter
1972	Jim Charlton
1973	E. Victor Snell
1974	Wm. H. McDonald
1975	Robert C. Willey
1976	Louise Graham
1977	Donald M. Stewart
1978	Leslie C. Hill
1979	Larry Gingras
1980	Dr. John S. Wilkinson
1981	Cecil Tannahill
1982	Jack Veffer
1983	Norm Williams
1984	Bruce R. Brace
1985	Ruth McQuade
1986	Ronald A. Greene
1987	Geoff Bell
1988	Ross W. Irwin
1989	Graham Esler
1990	Robert J. Graham
1991	John Regitko
1992	Yvon Marquis
1993	Kenneth B. Prophet
1994	Walter D. Allan
1995	Paul Johnson
1996	D.E. (Ted) Leitch
1997	R. Brian Cornwell
1998	James A. Haxby
1999	Kenneth A. Palmer
2000	Earl J. Salterio
2001	Jerome H. Remick
2002	William (Bill) K. Cross
2003	Harold Don Allen
2004	Dick Dunn
2005	Freeman Clowery
2006	Harry N. James
2008	Jean-Pierre Pare

== Royal Canadian Mint Award ==
On July 8, 1976, Royal Canadian Mint president, Yvon Gariepy announced that an annual award would be bestowed to the Canadian deemed to have contributed the most to numismatic education in Canada. The award was in the form of a sterling silver medal, and would be known as the Royal Canadian Mint Award. It measures 45 mm in diameter and depicts a view of the Royal Canadian Mint building on 320 Sussex Drive in Ottawa. The name of the recipient and the year are engraved on the reverse. A panel of numismatists, along with the Royal Canadian Mint, selects the winner. The award is presented at the Annual Royal Canadian Numismatic Association Convention.

Year	Winner
1976	Norman C. Williams
1977	Robert C. Willey
1978	Dr. James A Haxby
1979	Harold Don Allen
1980	Al Bliman
1981	J.D. Ferguson
1982	Louis H. Lewry
1983	Sheldon S. Carroll
1984	Ross W. Irwin
1985	Not awarded
1986	Not awarded
1987	Yvon Marquis
1988	Jim Charlton
1989	Robert Graham
1990	Graham Esler
