= Charlton Press =

Canadian publishing company

The Charlton Press is a book publishing company that produces pricing guides as well as other books on related topics, including collectibles (coins, banknotes, medals, sports cards, clocks, and dolls) and porcelain figures. The company's first title was Catalogue of Canadian Coins, Tokens & Fractional Currency, published in 1952, and contained all coins used as circulating tender in Canada from 1858 until present.

== Origins of the Charlton Press ==
It was James (Jim) Charlton's (July 26, 1911 – September 20, 2013) experience as an avid numismatist that inspired him to create a catalogue for coin collectors. In 1926, when Jim Charlton was 15, his older brother Harry Charlton gifted him a United States 1863 Indian Head cent.

It was from this initial exposure to coins that Jim Charlton developed an interest in numismatics, frequently visiting coin dealers, and purchasing coins from second-hand stores in Toronto, Ontario, Canada. Charlton continued to cultivate his interest in coins while moving to Northern Ontario for work as an engineer from 1933 to 1948. However, it was his return to Toronto in April 1948 after accepting a position as a steam engineer for the Star (now Toronto Star) that allowed him to expand his collection. By actively acquiring withdrawn circulation coinage from bank acquisitions, coin auctions, and inventories from coin shops, Charlton's collection grew exponentially.

While continuing his work as chief steam engineer at The Star, Charlton ran Canada Coin Exchange, a coin business from his home on a part-time basis during evenings and Saturdays with his wife Mary (nee Tyndall) from 1948 until 1956.

== Canada Coin Exchange: The early years (1952–1959) ==
Charlton had been actively buying and selling coins since 1948 and conducting a number of mail auction sales beginning in 1950. It was during this time that he realized the need for a Canadian catalogue which would provide accurate values of coins. Based on his experience as an auctioneer, he realized that the only catalogue on Canadian coins, one published by Wayte Raymond (Coins and Tokens of Canada, 1947), was outdated. While Raymond's publication listed coinage by dates, mint marks, mintages and values, and was an improvement from its earlier 1937 publication, listed coin values did not correspond to the values received at bid during auction. It was the selling prices of those sales in which Charlton auctioneered that helped to establish the baseline values for the first catalogue.

In 1952, Jim Charlton with the assistance of Fred Bowman and other numismatic students, released the company's first title, the Catalogue of Canadian Coins, Tokens & Fractional Currency, 1st edition. A publication at 34 pages, the catalogue filled a void for Canadian coin collectors and featured then current values and listings of Canadian coins. The original catalogue and all catalogues until 1959, were saddle-stitched with various coloured paper covers. Folded sheets were correlated and then stapled through the folded cover crease from the outside. With the exception of 1954, the catalogue was updated yearly until 1959 when the catalogue underwent a major revision.

The growing popularity of numismatics in Canada in the 1950s necessitated Jim Charlton's expansion of his home-based business into a separate retail location. He opened Canada Coin Exchange at 53 Front Street, Toronto, Ontario, on August 2, 1956. A few months after opening Front Street, Charlton, his wife, and two employees suffered a botched armed robbery at gunpoint by two Toronto men. Due to safety concerns, Charlton then relocated Canada Coin Exchange and consolidated the store, office, and warehouse into one location. His new shop at 80 Richmond Street, Toronto, Ontario, was opened on October 31, 1958, and his operations remained there until August 1965.

== The Whitman years (1960–1969) ==
In 1959, the coin catalogue (8th edition) underwent a major revision not only in terms of its content, but also with regards to the logistics of publication and distribution.

=== Yeoman and Bressett ===
Before the printing of the catalogue's 8th edition, Charlton had been contacted by Richard S. Yeoman (of Yeoman and Bressett) with a proposal for a new expanded edition to the Catalogue of Canadian Coins, Tokens & Fractional Currency. Having the facilities, experience and market potential that Jim Charlton lacked, Yeoman and Bressett became responsible for the printing, sales, and distribution of the catalogues through Whitman's Coin Products Division for the next ten years (1960–1969) until the 19th edition. During the "Whitman Years", the catalogue was modified to a blue hardcover case bound publication, where individual segments were sewn together, before the spine was flattened, and the hard cover attached. The blue cloth-bound soil-resistant hard cover was continued until 1969.

Having Richard Yeoman handle the Charlton catalogue was a fortuitous pairing for the Canadian coin catalogue. Yeoman was an integral part of Whitman Publishing. He had helped to cultivate an extensive sales network for coin related material. His experience in compiling definitive coin price guides (the Handbook of United States Coins aka the Blue Book, and A Guide Book of United States Coins aka the Red Book) was invaluable in increasing sales and interest in Canadian numismatics.

In addition to pairing with Whitman, modifications were also made to the content of the 1960 catalogue. The catalogue itself underwent a formatting modification, with the incorporation of more individual and larger illustrations of coins and tokens, additional information on coins and bills themselves, reassembling of data, mint statistics and prices on one page, the inclusion of grading standards, the inclusion of die varieties never previously catalogued, and an increase in pages to 128 from its previously 34. The length of the catalogue was limited to no more than 128 pages given the limitations of printing technology. At the time, a press could only handle a sheet that contained the equivalent of 128 smaller sheets.

=== The inclusion of government paper money ===
For the first time, Jim Charlton also included government paper money issues of Canada and Newfoundland in its catalogue listings. This resulted in renaming the catalogue from the Catalogue of Canadian Coins, Tokens & Fractional Currency to the Standard Catalogue of Canadian Coins, Token & Paper Money.

But the inclusion of paper money in the catalogue was not without its difficulties. Jim Charlton had long desired for his catalogue to reflect the growing interest in paper bills. When he explored the possibility in 1954, he encountered obstacles given that he had not received permission to publish such a catalogue with illustrations of paper money from the Bank of Canada and the Department of Finance. Doing so would contravene the Criminal Code (section 471(b)551).

At the same time that Charlton was exploring the possibility of incorporating bank note illustrations, James Elliott Jr. was independently working on a paper money catalogue. But, unlike Elliott who published his catalogue without illustrations, Charlton took a risk and published a modest catalogue on Canadian and Newfoundland government paper money with a 1955 issue date using reduced size note face illustrations. Charlton was hopeful that no action would be taken against him by the Government of Canada. Years prior in 1947, the Department of Finance had not instigated legal proceedings against W.H. Kernohan of Forest, Ontario who had released educational material in the form of a chart featuring banknote illustrations. As Jim Charlton stated about Kernohan, "So, I figured to myself, 'if he can do that, I think I've got a good case if they decide to come after me.'"

Nonetheless, fearing seizure of the printed matter, Charlton kept the majority of the publications in the basement of his brother's residence in Mississauga, Ontario. Luckily, no such seizure occurred and in fact, the Central Bank ordered a copy of the catalogue. It was soon thereafter that Elliott released a second catalogue with full illustrations of paper bills, using fronts and backs.

The new format and content was well received in a book review printed in The Numismatist's December 1959 issue. Hailed as a "milestone in Canadian numismatics," Charlton's catalogue was recommended for "the shelf of any collector interested in Canadian numismatics, or wishing to appreciate the place of these important series in the world picture."

=== Coin guide ===
In 1961, Canada Coin Exchange published The Charlton Coin Guide, the definitive guidebook on determining the worth and value of a coin. For those interested in coin accumulation evaluation, the Coin Guide contained not only buying prices for coins of Canada and Newfoundland, but also for Canadian Paper Money from 1935 Bank of Canada issues up to present times, Canadian colonial tokens, war medals and decorations, United States coinage and common gold coins of the world. In addition to legal tender coinage, the Coin Guide also provided information on all Royal Canadian Mint issues. The guide was created in response to a common problem of collectors experiencing difficulty discovering the value of their coins held.

Today, the Coin Guide is Canada's oldest continuously published buying guide and serves as a concise reference on the buying prices dealers will pay for coins. The Coin Guide is currently in its 54th edition.

=== Charlton and Whitman part ways ===
Charlton and Whitman eventually parted ways in 1970 after their decade-long pairing due to a disagreement over the pricing structure listed in the Canadian catalogue. Between 1965 and 1967, the coin business hit a recession in Canada. Proof like sets had peaked and new issues were flooding the market, saturating it. As a consequence, there was a significant price decrease in the market for coins and more dealers were turning to precious metals. Jim Charlton felt that reflecting this downturn in his catalogue was not warranted, whereas Whitman was adamant that values listed in the Canadian catalogue should account for the market's price decrease. Unable to reach a compromise, Jim Charlton once again resumed full publishing of Canadian Coins, Tokens and Paper Money.

With the demands of the coin business taking his free time from his wife Mary and son Jimmy, Jim Charlton left The Star after 13 years of employment in 1961. He continued his relationship with the newspaper in a capacity unrelated to his employed profession, that is, writing the Coins column for The Star until 1968.

=== The expansion of Canada Coin Exchange ===
Focusing entirely on his coin business, Jim Charlton opened a retail store for Canada Coin Exchange at 49 Queen Street East on June 26, 1963, while keeping the Richmond Street location as a warehouse. It was at this time that Charlton International Publishing Inc. was incorporated on August 28, 1963.

Eventually, operations of the store and office were transferred to 92 Jarvis Street in August 1965. While the business prospered, Jim Charlton found the demands deprived him of his time with family and he sold the supply business (Canadian Coin and Stamp Supply) along with the building to Jack Alexander Forbes of Dartmouth, Nova Scotia on July 2, 1967 while retaining the numismatic business (Canada Coin Exchange), which he relocated to 6 Adelaide Street East, Room 509. He also remained as editor and publisher of the Standard Catalogue of Canadian Coins, Tokens and Paper Money. The inventory of Canada Coin Exchange was eventually liquidated in 1969 under the new owners Richard Robinson and Fred Samuels on May 1, 1969.

== The Charlton Publications (1970–1972) – 19th to 21st editions ==
After parting ways with Whitman, Jim Charlton resumed publication of the catalogue for the 1971 (the 19th edition). By the early 1970s, the condition of coins became an important factor of consideration for collectors. Grades for coins allowed collectors to more accurately estimate the value of their coins. Thus, with input from dealers who precipitated the change, the coin catalogue was not only modified to incorporate the value association with a coin's condition, but also incorporated more Canadian and Newfoundland bank paper issues. The total page number of the catalogue was increased to 200.

When Jim Charlton was editor of the catalogue, it was his common practise to walk around Toronto, asking dealers about the prices they were paying for coins. Charlton would then correlate these prices and adjust his catalogue figures as necessary. He continued this practise until 1976.

It was also at this time, that the Charlton catalogue moved away from the hard cover binding of the Whitman years, to perfect binding, a method where the pages and cover were glued together at the spine. Charlton International Publishing Inc. used perfect binding for their catalogues until 2003.

== The Charlton International Publishing Inc. – 22nd to 30th editions ==
Four years after he had purchased the coin supply business from Jim Charlton in 1967, Jack Alexander Forbes placed an advertisement in the newspaper advertising the sale of Canada Coin and Stamp Supply. Due to his failing health and his own son's lack of interest in the business, Forbes sold Canada Coin and Stamp Supply (formally known as Charlton Coin & Stamp Co. Ltd.) to William (Bill) K. Cross of Toronto, Ontario in September 1972.

=== William Cross ===
William Cross was a chemical engineer who worked for DuPont selling elastomer (rubber) products. As a travelling salesman, he often found himself dividing his time between Ottawa, Montreal, and Toronto. After pitching to companies on the marvels of elastomer, Cross would often visit coin shops in the area during his spare time before heading home, particularly in Ottawa. While employed full time at DuPont, Cross bought and sold coins on the side as a part time dealer.

It was his mother who first initiated his interest in coins, having always set aside coins from a young age. Cross' move from engineer to coin dealer came when his manager gave Cross an ultimatum to either "work harder or leave." Cross chose to leave and make numismatics his full time passion by founding the Red Cent Coin Company (formally known as the Red Cent Coin Ltd.) in 1964. Located at 3030 Bathurst Street, Toronto, Ontario, the Red Cent Coin Company operated primarily as a numismatics company between the years of 1964 and 1966. Due to the downdraft and decreasing value and interest in coins that occurred with the coin recession in the mid-1960s, the Red Cent Coin Company shifted its focus to bullion products, buying gold and silver, and bullion gold numismatics wholesale from 1966 to 1972. While the Red Cent Coin Company no longer had a brick and mortar store, they did have offices located on Adelaide Street in 1966, which they shared with Cale Jarvis, the publisher of Canadian Coin News. As Bill Cross recalls of this time:

We closed 3030 Bathurst Street in 1966 due to the downdraft in the market. We went into the bullion business and into the precious metal business, buying gold and silver. We travelled back and forth from Europe buying numismatic coins, gold coins and all those wonderful things. We used to buy sovereigns for example, out of London, England which didn't require export permits, and bring them back to Toronto with the intention of selling them to the United States. After applying for import permits from the United States government, we took the coins to the US and sold them there.

=== Bill Cross meets Jim Charlton ===
Bill Cross' first introduction to Jim Charlton occurred in 1962 or 1963 when Cross purchased a 1937 mirror proof set of coins from the British company Seaby, which he took to Charlton to have evaluated. While he disagreed with Charlton's assessment that his purchase was rubbish, his admiration and passion for the hobby never abated. In fact, Cross had always wanted to own the book end of Charlton, admiring what was considered to be the bible for Canadian numismatics. His passion for the hobby eventually led to Cross founding and becoming acting President of the Canadian Association of Numismatic Dealers (1976–1980), and purchasing Torex (Canada's most popular coin and paper money show) from 1976 to 1984. In November 1986, Bill Cross, along with Brian Cornwell, and Ingrid K. Smith founded the International Coin Certification Service (I.C.C.S), a third party coin grading service that evaluates coins, their authenticity, their grade, and ultimately their worth. Cross sold his share in I.C.C.S in 2009. Cross was also honorary chair of the Royal Canadian Numismatic Association (RCNA) at the World's Fair of Money in 2014, and recipient of the J. Douglas Ferguson Award in 2002. At the 2015 RCNA convention, Cross received the organization's highest distinction, The Paul Fiocca Award for "long term meritorious service or major contributions to the RCNA", the same award that James E. Charlton received in 2008.

When Bill Cross purchased the coin and stamp supply business from Jack Alexander Forbes in 1972, he negotiated a deal that would include purchasing the "Charlton" name, as well as the copyrights and sole publishing rights held by Charlton and all the Charlton books. In his initial explorations of purchasing the company from Jack Alexander Forbes, Bill Cross insisted that the copyrights to his catalogues be included in the sale. When Cross was notified that no such provision had been negotiated in the original Charlton-Forbes deal, Cross recalls that the "sale came to a screeching halt." When Forbes approached Charlton five years after the business deal had been finalized, Jim Charlton granted permission for the acquisition, including extending copyright to the Standard Catalogue of Canadian Coins. As Cross reminisces:

Forbes went to Jim and Jim signed over the copyrights to Canada Coin and Stamp to Forbes in order that the sale could go through. He signed over the catalogue copyrights five years after the original sale, with no gain to him. There are very few people who would do this. Jim was a man of honour.

After Cross successfully purchased the business from Forbes in 1972, he immediately acquired another business, International Stamp Supplies (formally International Stamp Co.) months afterwards and combined the two newly acquired companies and renamed them to Charlton International Publishing. Shortly afterwards, Bill Cross formed Charlton Numismatics.

In September 1972, Cross then relocated Charlton's to 299 Queen Street West, Toronto, Ontario, the current CityTV building, and the former Ryerson Press building and operated out of that location for 12 years. The Charlton enterprises not only included Charlton Numismatics Ltd. (the largest coin company in Canada in the 1970s), but also Charlton International Publishing Inc., as well as an auction room, all under one roof.

At the same time in the late 1960s and early 1970s, Cross continued operating the Red Cent Coin Company, with eventual plans to gradually phase out that aspect of the business.

The Red Cent Coin Company was eventually consolidated with Charlton International Publishing in 1979 to become Charlton International, which handled both the publishing and supply end of Cross' business. At the time, Charlton Numismatics was one of the leading coin companies in Canada, as well as buying and selling jewellery and other collectables. As Cross explains, Charlton Numismatics was the first to offer jewellery gold chains by weight. Cross would import the chains from Italy and sell to the public by the gram. So popular was his service that during the Christmas season, Charlton Numismatics would often sell a profitable sum in gold chain alone.

With Cross at the helm, and Charlton assuming an editorial position with the catalogues, the catalogue increased in size from 200 pages to 341 pages between the years of 1971 and 1978. In 1976, a decision was made to publish a more reader-friendly format that would split the coin catalogue by removing the token and paper money content to devote to two separate books, lest collectors be faced with an unnecessarily thick publication.

=== Charlton Standard Catalogue of Canadian Paper Money & Charlton Standard Catalogue of Canadian Government Paper Money ===
Taking three years to compile information, The Charlton Standard Catalogue of Canadian Paper Money, 1st edition published in 1980 and The Charlton Standard Catalogue of Canadian Government Paper Money, 1st edition was published in 1984. The former publication was published with an impressive 820 pages due to the fact that The Charlton Press incorporated banknotes from over 152 Chartered Banks in Canada as well as a section on Merchant Scrip.

It was also at this time that the Charlton Catalogue Numbering System was introduced in the Charlton Standard Catalogue of Canadian Paper Money. As a new feature, The Charlton Press identified every Canadian banknote with an identification number, a system that had been in place for Dominion notes and Bank of Canada notes already. As explained in the catalogue, each banknote was identified with a number in the form of "123-04B0-3a". The first series represented the bank number. The second series represented the issue and sub-issue(s) with two spaces for the issue number, one space for the sub-issue letter and one space for the sub-issue number. The third series represented the denomination and occurrence of the note.

The Charlton Standard Catalogue of Canadian Paper Money is published once every three years. The Charlton Standard Catalogue of Canadian Government Paper Money is published annually.

=== Charltons Standard Catalogue of Canadian Coins ===
After removing the paper money section from the coin catalogue, the coin catalogue was renamed to Charltons Standard Catalogue of Canadian Coins, 27th edition and included information on decimal coins, patterns, trial pieces, and collector's coins. The cleaving permitted the incorporation of more background information on varieties.

Between 1976 and 1980, there was a run in gold and silver on the market. With prices rapidly fluctuating, The Charlton Press started issuing semi-annual releases (Winter and Summer) of the Standard Catalogue of Canadian Coins to keep up with the ever-fickle market. Thus from 1979 to 1984, there were 10 editions released in total (editions 27 to 38). Reverting to annual releases in 1985 account for The Charlton Press' release of its 69th edition in 2014, its 63rd year of operation.

== The Charlton Press (1980 to 2003) – 31st to 57th editions ==
In 1980, The Charlton Press imprint, the broken book and half maple leaf logo, was adopted and came to be the imprint for the standard catalogues. The logo was designed and officially registered by Donald Lorimer on December 2, 1976 by the name "Half Maple Leaf in open book/Broken Books/Toronto".

Donald Lorimer had come to work for Charlton International Publishing Inc. in 1977 as a manager for Publishing. Early in 1979, Lorimer worked on a logo for Charlton International Publishing Inc and suggested that the company consider the half maple leaf and open book logo. Lorimer's suggestion was accepted and on November 8, 1979 it was filed and then officially registered on October 17, 1980, with the title modified to "Half Maple Leaf open book/The Charlton Press".

When Bill Cross assumed the helm of the publishing business in 1972, Jim Charlton continued in his capacity as editor of the coin catalogue until 1980, the 30th edition, though technically Jim Charlton had ceased his editorial functions by 1976. In 1980, Jim Charlton officially stepped down from The Charlton Press and the coin catalogue he had founded 28 years prior. Bill Cross assumed full editorial and authorial responsibilities for the 31st edition of the Standard Catalogue of Canadian coins and onwards, as well as all numismatic catalogues and hobbyist material bearing the Charlton name.

In 1979, Cross disposed of the coin supply and stamp business, while retaining the numismatic and publishing side of Charlton's, which he renamed Charlton International Inc. In November 1984, Charlton's was relocated to the Yonge and Summerhill area in Toronto, Ontario on 15 Birch Avenue. In November 1989, the company was relocated once again to 2010 Yonge Street.

=== 36th anniversary edition ===
In 1988, a special edition celebrating The Charlton Press' 36th anniversary was published that was limited to 1000 serialized copies, each one of which was autographed by Jim Charlton and Bill Cross. The special edition, with 796 pages, included a reprint of the 1952, 1st edition catalogue in its entirety, the 1988 42nd edition of The Charlton Standard Catalogue of Canadian Coins, the 1987 2nd edition of The Charlton Standard Catalogue of Canadian Government Paper Money, and the 1988 1st edition of The Charlton Standard Catalogue of Canadian Colonial Tokens. Each section was separated by a coloured cover. This special edition was the first time since 1978 that the Charlton catalogue featured both tokens and paper money alongside coins in one publication.

=== Canadian Colonial Tokens ===
In that same year, The Charlton Press also published a stand alone catalogue of Canadian Colonial Tokens (prior to 1867). The standalone catalogue with 218 pages was researched extensively after the decision was made to remove the token and paper money content from the catalogue in 1976. Tokens were issued by provincial governments, chartered banks and merchants, due to the shortage of copper currency.

In the 7th edition of Canadian Colonial Tokens published in 2010, The Charlton Press changed the size of the book from 5.5 in × 7 in (140 mm × 180 mm) to 7 in × 9 in (180 mm × 230 mm). This allowed more space for images, better illustrations, and the incorporation of reference numbers and rarity numbers. The Charlton Standard Catalogue of Canadian Colonial Tokens is currently in its 10th edition and is published once every few years.

=== Charlton Standard Catalogue of Canadian Bank Notes ===
A year later in 1989, The Charlton Standard Catalogue of Canadian Paper Money, was renamed to The Charlton Standard Catalogue of Canadian Bank Notes to reflect the removal of Merchant Scrip from the catalogue's 1st edition. Merchant Scrip would receive its own catalogue in due time.

The catalogue contained all bank notes produced in Canada since the 1800s, from the Bank of Acadia to the Zimmerman Bank.

In the 8th edition released in 2014, the catalogue was updated and reorganized to accommodate more census information, to identify notes which had been donated to institutional collections, and to account for recently discovered notes. Listings were expanded and extensively revised for some bank notes, and notices were added reminding readers of valuations as being inextricably linked to Charlton grading standards.

Published with 616 pages, The Charlton Standard Catalogue of Canadian Bank Notes is currently in its 8th edition.

In November 1996, Charlton's relocated to 2040 Yonge Street, with the numismatics store occupying the ground floor, and the publishing portion occupying the upper level. Seven years later in November 2001, Bill Cross closed Charlton Numismatics to focus solely on Charlton Publishing, and relocated the business to North York, Ontario.

=== A Tribute to Jim Charlton: Coinman to Canadians ===
In 2001, as homage to Jim Charlton's legacy, and on the occasion of his 90th birthday, The Charlton Press released a biography of Jim Charlton authored by H. Don Allen. J.E. Charlton: Coinman to Canadians was prepared from papers left by Jim Charlton as well as personal correspondence and conversations between the author and "Mr. Coin". Charlton's papers, an impressive archive of material that he himself had set aside included write-ups from club bulletins, clippings, pamphlets, photographs, and other ephemera.

=== Golden Anniversary: Charlton Standards ===
In 2002, to mark the 50th anniversary of the release of Charlton's first coin catalogue, The Charlton Press published a limited edition hard bound copy entitled Golden Anniversary The Charlton Standards 1952 – 2002 which contained the two most popular "Standards", Canadian Coins, 56th edition, and Canadian Government Paper Money, 14th edition. The 708-page release was limited to 1000 red leatherette copies, and 60 black leather-bound copies.

== The Charlton Press (2003 to 2015) – 57th to 69th editions ==
=== Charlton Standard Catalogue of Canadian Coins ===
In 2003, the 57th edition, The Charlton Press once against redesigned the Charlton Standard Catalogue of Canadian Coins by offering a plastic coil bound option as well as the perfect binding used from 1971 onward. While both varieties of binding were sold for the 57th edition, by the 58th edition, all Charlton Standard Catalogues of Canadian Coins had adopted the plastic coil bound format due to customer preference.

The 58th, 2004 edition saw three major additions to the catalogue which included a 40-page section on varieties (the first of a continuing series), portraits of Victorian Newfoundland were all illustrated, and finally, pricing was provided for Victorian portraits.

Incorporating a supplementary section on varieties in the Charlton Standard Catalogue of Canadian Coins was to continue until the 69th edition. The supplements were as follows:

Edition	Year	Supplement subject
58th	2004	Charlton-Zoell Variety Catalogue that featured a 40-page section on varieties authored by William K. Cross.
59th	2005	Over 80-pages on varieties that attempted to accommodate a numbering system tracking Canadian varieties, including the 1954 five-cent Shoulder Fold variety authored by William K. Cross.
60th	2006	An 89-page section devoted to dollar varieties with over a hundred different listings authored by William K. Cross. Part I of Canadian die varieties.
61st	2007	Over 90-page section devoted to fifty cent Victoria die series with emphasis on varieties from 1870 to 1901 authored by William K. Cross. Part II of Canadian die varieties.
62nd	2008	Over 100-page section devoted to Victoria twenty-five-cent varieties from 1858 to 1901 authored by William K. Cross. Part III of Canadian die varieties.
63rd	2009	Over 70-page section devoted to 90 different varieties of Victorian ten cents from 1858 to 1901 authored by William K. Cross. Part IV of Canadian die varieties.
64th	2010	Over 150-page section covering Victoria five-cent silver varieties covering over 150 different varieties from 1858 to 1901 authored by William K. Cross. Part V of Canadian die varieties.
65th	2011	An 85-page section illustrating 81 different varieties of Victoria large cents 1858–1901 authored by William K. Cross. Part VI of Canadian die varieties.
66th	2012	A 60-page section devoted to circulating silver dollar varieties revised from 1935 to 1967 authored by William K. Cross.
67th	2013	A 36-page section covering over 83 varieties of nickel dollar varieties issued between 1968 and 1987 authored by Roger Paulen.
68th	2014	A 41-page section devoted to George VI fifty cent varieties, 1937 to 1952 authored by Paul Glover.
69th	2015	A section devoted to detecting Chinese counterfeit 25 and 50-cent pieces authored by Mike Marshall.

As editorial assistant Jean Dale of The Charlton Press notes, the supplementary lists included in the Charlton Catalogues are incomplete as "there are many more die varieties to be discovered as well as Chinese counterfeits to be found and illustrated."

In addition to housing a supplementary section on George VI varieties, the 61st edition was redesigned with fewer pages and its size was increased to 7 in × 9 in (180 mm × 230 mm), spiral bound. Tables carried up to 12 pricing columns.

=== Canadian Merchant Scrip ===
In 2007, 14 years after its removal from The Charlton Standard Catalogue of Canadian Paper Money, The Charlton Press released its first edition catalogue of Canadian Merchant Scrip. Scrip was a substitute for money that could be used like cash to purchase products or services from the merchants who issued them. While Merchant Scrip had been covered in the coin catalogue in a 47-page section, the values found therein were out of date. Listing by province of origin and presented alphabetically, the catalogue on Merchant Scrip currently provides illustrations, dimensions, dates, imprints, and price lists based on data obtained from collectors and dealers.

The Charlton Standard Catalogue of Canadian Merchant Scrip is currently in its 1st edition.

=== Copper Coinage of Canada ===
In that same year, The Charlton Press also released a catalogue of Copper Coinage of Canada, which was essentially a reprint of Batty's Canadian Copper Coinage. Beginning in 1868, D.T. Batty began cataloguing English and Colonial copper coinage, authoring four volumes spanning over 1300 pages. Over 27 years starting from 1868, Batty sold by subscription parts of his publication, all except the final volume listing Colonial Copper Coinage, due to his death. Excerpted for reprint is Batty's section on Canadian coinage which lists over 2100 varieties of Colonial, Province of Canada and Dominion of Canada coinage.

=== The Beginning of Volume I and Volume II of Canadian Coins ===
The 63rd edition of the Charlton Standard Catalogue on Canadian Coins (2009) was the final edition of the coin catalogue that contained all coins under one cover. Beginning with the 64th edition, The Charlton Press separated the catalogue into two volumes.

Volume one, covered numismatic issues whereas volume two focused on collector issues. This was undertaken because of the limitations of plastic coil binding at approximately 600 pages. Had the press not separated the catalogue, collectors would have been faced with an unwieldy 650-page book.

Today, the volumes are separated based on type of coinage. Canadian Coins, Volume One: Numismatic Issues catalogues coins which have been circulated in Canada from the time of the French Regime to present day, as well as coinage from Nova Scotia, New Brunswick, Prince Edward Island, Newfoundland, and the Province of Canada, plus Specimen Coins and Sets, Patterns, and Test Tokens. Canadian Coins, Volume Two: Collector Issues catalogues collector and giftware products produced from 1954 to present, including Olympic coins, non-circulating legal tender coins (NCLT) and others.

=== Monographs: Die Varieties of Large Bronze Cents ===
Between 2006 and 2010, The Charlton Press released a series of three monographs covering the die varieties of large bronze cents used in Canada between 1858 and 1936: Dominion of Canada Die Varieties of Edward VII and George V Large Cents (Monograph 3) released in July 2006, Newfoundland and British North America Die Varieties of Cents and Half Cents 1861–1936 (Monograph 4) released September 2006, and Some Die Varieties of the Large Cents of British North America and Canada (Monograph 1) released February 2010. Attributed posthumously to Jack Griffin who authored some aspects of the series, Griffin had spent over 50 years collecting and recording varieties of large cents. Originally conceived as a four series set which included tables and images illustrating varieties, The Charlton Press had to rethink the entirety of the monograph series upon Griffin's passing in July 2008. What was published, was an updated release featuring an additional 47 pages of new information and over 250 images to Some Die Varieties of the Large Cents of British North America and Canada (2nd Edition), which had an original publication date of 1992. In addition, the Charlton Press had previously started including variety sections in the standard catalogue, and a number of books on Victoria Large Cent Varieties published by Rob Turner had been released.

=== Other numismatic, militaria and historical medal-related books ===
In addition to the above publications, The Charlton Press has also released a number of other numismatic, militaria, and historical medal related books including:

- Exploring Canadian Colonial Tokens (1st edition)
- First World War Canadian Infantry Badges (1st edition)
- Medals of Governors General in Canada (1st edition)
- Monnaies Canadiennes (the 50th Edition of the Charlton Standard Catalogue of Canadian Coins (in French)
- The Canadian Medal Rolls – Distinguished Conduct and Military Medal (1st edition)
- The Canadian Medal Rolls – Distinguished Flying Medal (1939–1945) (1st edition)
- The Charlton Colonial Token Workbook (1st edition)
- The Charlton Standard Catalogue of Canadian Communion Tokens (1st edition)
- The Charlton Standard Catalogue of Canadian Tire Cash Bonus Coupons (2nd edition)
- The Charlton Standard Catalogue of the Canadian Numismatic Association's Medals and Awards (2nd edition)
- The Medal Roll of the Red River Campaign of 1870 in Canada (1st edition)
- World War One Canadian Corps Badges (1st edition)

== Non-numismatic series ==
=== Royal Doulton catalogues ===
The Charlton Press has introduced a number of other catalogues on such hobbyist pursuits as medals, sports cards, clocks, dolls, and porcelain figures. In fact, The Charlton Press' publication of catalogues on Royal Doulton Figurines has sold an estimated 100,000 copies worldwide.

Bill Cross recalls an historical anecdote involving the sale of Royal Doulton figurines and a murder plot at Charlton Numismatics. As he explains, a man had walked into Charlton Numismatics with a list of a couple hundred Royal Doulton figurines, which Cross purchased. As part of the purchase agreement, a helper from Charlton Numismatics picked up the figurines from the man's home, while also agreeing to drop off a trunk that was to be shipped to Vancouver. The transaction went smoothly, with the Royal Doulton figurines picked up, inventoried and itemized, while the trunk was dropped off at Toronto's Union station. After the trunk arrived in Vancouver, it was not claimed and when curious employees opened the trunk days later, they found the man's dead wife inside. The police came to Charlton Numismatics and seized all of the Royal Doulton figurines as they were needed as evidence in the court case. The man was convicted and eventually, the figurines were returned to Charlton Numismatics where they were then auctioned off.

=== Sports catalogues ===
The Charlton Press has also published catalogues in the Sports realm on Hockey Cards (16th edition), the Canadian Football Card Price Guide (4th edition), and the Canadian Baseball Card Price Guide (3rd edition).

In the Canadiana realm, there are: The Charlton Standard Catalogue of Canadian Dolls (3rd edition), The Charlton Standard Catalogue of Canadian Clocks (2nd edition), and The Charlton Standard Catalogue of Canadian Country Store Collectables (3rd edition)

=== Other collectables ===
The Charlton Press has published a number of catalogues on collectables which include:

- Charlton Standard Catalogue on Beswick Animals (10th edition)
- Charlton Standard Catalogue on Beswick Collectables (10th edition)
- Charlton Standard Catalogue on Border Fine Arts Figurines (3rd edition)
- Charlton Standard Catalogue on Caithness Paperweights (2nd edition)
- Charlton Standard Catalogue on Chintz (2nd edition).
- Charlton Standard Catalogue on Coalport Figurines and Collectables (3rd edition)
- Charlton Standard Catalogue on Collector's Guide to Ontario (7th edition)
- Charlton Standard Catalogue on Hagen-Renaker (3rd edition)
- Charlton Standard Catalogue on Lilliput Lane Cottages (3rd edition)
- Charlton Standard Catalogue on Royal Doulton Animals (4th edition)
- Charlton Standard Catalogue on Royal Doulton Beswick Storybook Figurines (6th edition)
- Charlton Standard Catalogue on Royal Doulton Bunnykins (3rd edition)
- Charlton Standard Catalogue on Royal Doulton Collectables (4th edition)
- Charlton Standard Catalogue on Royal Doulton Figurines (12th edition)
- Charlton Standard Catalogue on Royal Doulton Jugs (10th edition)
- Charlton Standard Catalogue on Royal Worcester Figurines (3rd edition)
- Charlton Standard Catalogue on Storybook Figurines (8th edition)
- Charlton Standard Catalogue on Wade Collectables (4th edition)
- Charlton Standard Catalogue on Wade Decorative Ware – Volume Two (3rd edition)
- Charlton Standard Catalogue on Wade General Issues (3rd edition)
- Charlton Standard Catalogue on Wade Liquid Containers (3rd edition)
- Charlton Standard Catalogue on Wade Tableware – Volume Three (2nd edition)
- Charlton Standard Catalogue on Wade Whimsical Collectables (8th edition)

== The Charlton Press – legacy ==
Bill Cross kept The Charlton Press Canadian, with all production, and printing done in Canada. Initial publishing was done by Best Books, a Toronto outfit whose printing plant was based in Peterborough. When Transcontinental (currently named TC Transcontinental), a publishing company whose main printing operations were based in Quebec, bought out Best Books, Cross continued the business relationship. Part of Cross' consideration in keeping The Charlton Press printed in Canada was due to his concerns over quality control.

Building on the legacy of Jim Charlton's catalogue, Bill Cross also reconceptualized the coin catalogue to include more historical detail, photographs of coins and bills from their original line drawings, and rewrote and reorganized the catalogue. Since the early days of Jim Charlton's difficulties in printing images of bank notes, organizations such as the Royal Canadian Mint have now been cooperative with providing images of new releases based on an equitable trading system whereby The Charlton Press provides The Charlton Standard Catalogue of Canadian Coins, Volume I and Volume II to the mint. While The Charlton Press used to purchase one each of the non-circulating collector and maple leaf coins to photograph for their catalogues, their extensive network relationships with dealers and collectors have ensured that the catalogues will remain current with the latest release of product photographs.

=== Worldwide sales ===
A rough estimate by Robert Aaron, a columnist with the Toronto Star "Coins" feature in 1977 puts a figure of 1.25 million Charlton catalogues sales in the first 25 years of its publication. Cross estimates that since 1977:

- The Charlton Standard Catalogue of Canadian Coins, Volume I Numismatic Issues sells 15,000 books a year
- The Charlton Standard Catalogue of Canadian Coins, Volume II Collector and Maple Leaf Issues sells 5000 books a year
- The Charlton Standard Catalogue on Government Paper Money sells 5000 units a year
- The Charlton Standard Catalogue on Canadian Bank Notes sells 800 units a year
- The Charlton Standard Catalogue on Canadian Colonial Tokens sells 1500 units every publication

The Charlton Press' French edition catalogue has not been successful. While a French version was printed for the 50th anniversary, and which the Royal Canadian Mint sold 5000 copies, subsequent attempts to translate the catalogue into Canada's other official language has not proven marketable.

=== Canada's Coin Bible ===
Considered "Canada's Coin Bible" the Charlton Standard Catalogue of Canadian Coins provides comprehensive information on history, and records all legal tender coinage including current values, and major coin varieties for coins, die varieties as well as containing all coins that have been used as circulating tender in Canada from 1858 to present. Over 150 years of Canadian coins are listed, illustrated, and priced depicting standards of grading, along with varieties and illustrations for the avid collector. The Charlton Standard Catalogue of Canadian Coins has never recorded errors (e.g., double strikes, die clashes, and hanging numbers) as compiling information on errors would be a never-ending endeavour.

== The Charlton Press (2015 to present) ==
In 2015, The Charlton Press was sold.
