= Jerome Remick =

Canadian numismatist, geologist and columnist

Jerome "Jerry" Hosmer Remick III
- Born: September 11, 1928; Detroit, Michigan, U.S.
- Died: March 1, 2005 (aged 76); Quebec City, Quebec, Canada
- Education: University of Michigan

Jerome "Jerry" Hosmer Remick III (September 11, 1928 – March 1, 2005) was a Canadian numismatist, geologist and columnist for Canadian Coin News.

He had written more than 500 consecutive articles published in Canadian Coin News, dating back to 1978. These articles were related to municipal trade tokens, world paper money (more than 200 articles), and numerous book reviews. The same week that Remick died, two other Canadian luminaries died – Somer James and Earl Salterio, former President of the Royal Canadian Numismatic Association. In 2001, Remick was awarded the J. Douglas Ferguson medal at the Royal Canadian Numismatic Association convention in Quebec City.

Remick was born in Detroit, Michigan, on September 11, 1928. He died in his home in Québec City on March 1, 2005. His family has a long history in the United States. His forebear Christian Remich had arrived in Maine by 1651 at about age 20, his country of Ireland.

Successive generations of the Remick family made major contributions to the growth of their adopted country. Jerry's grandfather, the original Jerome Hosmer Remick, was a famous music publisher and businessman in the late 19th century – early 20th century Detroit. His grandfather's company was one of the leading Tin Pan Alley publishing houses. The legendary George Gershwin worked as a song plugger for Jerome H. Remick in 1916.

Originally a stamp collector, Remick started collecting coins as a teenager, when his Aunt gave him a Newfoundland coin. The history of the coins is what intrigued Remick. This led to Remick's numismatic contributions through his extensive numismatic writing and cataloguing. Remick was among the first collectors to inventory and list the coins of the British Commonwealth of Nations.

Jerry was also an ardent admirer and supporter of the Geological Association of Canada throughout his adult life. He spent his professional career with the Ministère des Ressources naturelles of Quebec, as a geologist. Later in life, he became the principal benefactor of the Canadian Geological Foundation.

He was a founding member of the Royal Canadian Numismatic Association in 1950. Ten years later, he was one of the founding members of the Quebec Numismatic Society. As a member of more than 70 clubs in 12 countries, he was also the founder of the Association of Personalized Medal Issuers (APMI). He struck nearly 200 personal medals, many of them Christmas issues, in three different metals since 1983.

Within the Royal Canadian Numismatic Association, he suggested or initiated a number of significant changes. He recommended establishing a fellowship, encouraged the RCNA to adopt a bilingual logo and suggested creating the Young Numismatists Kit. In 1994, he established a literary award for best article in a club newsletter.

Over more than 50 years, he encouraged many young collectors to remain in the hobby. On many occasions, he would supply these young collectors with coins or banknotes to start their collections. According to Graeme Petterwood, editor of the Numisnet World in Australia, Remick is the Canadian ambassador for world coins.

== Numismatic Books ==
His best known work is The Guide Book and Catalogue of the British Commonwealth Coins (originally written with Somer James and Howard Linecar). It was the first catalogue to group Commonwealth coins, listing coins of over 115 countries. The 1967 edition included four books in one, as Canadian, modern British, Australian and New Zealand coins were added to the list.

Alone, or in collaboration, Remick has authored the following books:

- The Coinage and Banknotes of Ireland 1928-1968
- The Complete Hong Kong Coin Catalogue 1863-1965
- The Complete Rhodesia Coin Catalogue 1932-1963
- The Coinage of the Dominican Republic (with Alcedo Almanzar)
- The Coinage of Jamaica (with Ray Byrne)
- The Guide Book and Catalogue of the British Commonwealth Coins (originally written with Somer James and Howard Linecar)

== Awards ==
- Certificate of Honour from the Krause Catalogue of World Paper Money (1996)
- Gouverneur of the SNQ - Québec Numismatic Society (1998)
- J. Douglas Ferguson Award, the highest honour in Canadian Numismatics (2001)
- Numismatic Achievement Award from Numismatics International
- Numismatic Research Award from the Canadian Numismatic Research Society
- P. Napoléon Breton Award from the Association des Numismates Francophones du Canada
- Royal Canadian Mint Numismatic Award for Youth Support (1995)
- Section Medal of the Québec Section of the Canadian Institute of Mining, Metallurgy and Petroleum (1998)

=== Fellowships ===
- Royal Canadian Numismatic Society
- CNRS
- Ontario Numismatic Society
- Royal Numismatic Society (England)
- South African Numismatic Society

=== Jerome H Remick III Literary Award Winners ===
Year	Winner	Year Awarded	Location
1994	Guy Veillette	1995	Calgary
1995	Jean Luc Giroux	1996	Montreal
1996	Jean Luc Giroux	1997	Moncton
1997	Yvon Marquis	1998	Edmonton
1998	Ian Hunter	1999	Kitchener
1999	Not Awarded	2000	Ottawa
2000	Not Awarded	2001	Québec City
2001	Geraldine Chimirri-Russell	2002	Vancouver
2002	Ken Cameron	2003	Windsor
2003	Wayne Jacobs	2004	Toronto
2004	Troy Carlson	2005	Calgary
2005	Pierre Bouchard	2006	Niagara Falls

== Memorial Medal ==
With the collaboration of Alan Trammell of Pressed Metal Products in Vancouver, a die was produced at no charge to commemorate the memory of Remick. The die was offered free of charge by those interested in having a personalized medal struck to pay tribute to Jerry.

The die shows Remick's portrait in the centre flanked by symbols representing the beginning and the end of life. The years 1928 and 2005 are located below each symbol. The wording JEROME H. REMICK, III appears above the design with a fleur-de-lys at left and a maple leaf at right. Below the design are the words, "Numismatist", "In Memoriam", "Numismate".

This inspired a project whereby sales of the medal were donated to Les Apprenp’tits Numismates (Apprentice Numismatists). Les Apprenp’tits also offered the medals in exchange for a donation to the Jerome Remick bourse. The concept of the bourse was that proceeds from the bourse would be awarded as an annual prize to a winning young student of a literary contest organized by Les Apprenp’tis.

== Auction ==
In late 2006, the Commonwealth collection of Jerry Remick was sold in a series of three auctions by the British firm Spink. The first sale, was held in several sessions on Oct. 18.

It covered just over 500 lots of Australian and Asian issues. The second part was on Nov. 29 covering numismatics from Europe, Africa and the Indian Ocean. The third part, to be held in early 2007, features the numismatics of Canada, Central America, the West Indies, and non-Commonwealth coins.

The Highlights from the Australian section include an Adelaide pound; eight 1938 Proofs; a 1937 pattern florin; and an unrecorded pattern crown of 1937. From Ceylon (now Sri Lanka), there is a pattern 5 cents of 1904, believed to be one of only two examples in private hands, and a group of Proof British trade dollars. Starting at the reign of Victoria, the Remick collection has many Hong Kong coins, including 37 Proofs, a dollar and two half-dollars, and no less than 47 patterns.

The auction catalogue summed up his collecting approach. "Remick collected coins of the British colonies and Commonwealth, aiming to bring together and study examples of not only each country and all its issues and denominations, but also every date, mint mark and variety of each coin. The extent to which this huge task was largely achieved can be judged from this and the succeeding catalogues of his collection," the introduction states. "Remick took advantage of the abundance of coins available at the time to secure many great rarities. He started collecting in an age when supply was plentiful." Other notes include, "Nearly every date and mint mark of every issue from most of the series is present. It is impossible to believe that a new collector today could match this collection in depth."

=== Auction Lots ===
The first session opens with the Adelaide pound (lot 1) of 1855. The Adelaide pounds were created as an alternative to the irregular ingots being produced at the assay office of the time. However, they were not authorized and eventually withdrawn and melted. Only about 200 remain. This one is described as AU/EF and is estimated at £10,000 to £15,000 ($21,100 to $31,700).

Lot 48 is a Proof florin of 1927. One of 400 struck in Proof, the coin is a rarity and its value is estimated at £3,500 to £4,000 ($7,400 to $8,500). An unrecorded uniface trial or pattern of the Australian crown of 1936 to 1952 has a blank obverse and a reverse with the 1937 date. Described as exceedingly rare, it is estimated at £15,000 to £20,000 ($31,700 to $42,400).

== Geology ==
Jerry obtained his B.Sc. degree in geology from the Michigan College of Mining and Technology (which later became the Michigan Technological University), Houghton, Michigan, in 1951, and his M.Sc. degree in geology from the same college in 1952. Graduate studies in geology and mineralogy were carried out at the University of Minnesota (1952–1953) and at the University of Michigan (1953–1957). During this time he became a member of the Michigan Chapter of the Gamma Alpha Graduate Scientific Fraternity. His first geological field work was with the Québec Department of Mines (now the Ministère des Ressources naturelles) beginning in the summer of 1952.

By 1955 Jerry was chief of his own field parties in Québec. Eventually, he accepted a permanent position with the department in May 1957. For the next 20 years he carried out field work, first doing regional geological mapping southwest of the town of Chibougamau, and later carrying out reconnaissance mapping using large helicopter-supported field parties in the James Bay area of northwestern Québec. Remick also spent many summers in northern Québec surveying the lands.

The passion for coins and medals led Remick to encourage the development of medals in recognition of excellence within the GAC. He supported the design and adoption of the Volcanology and Igneous Petrology Division's Career Achievement Award and the Leopold Gelinas Medal. Remick actually paid for the dies and the first striking of medals. He would later be consulted on the design of the GAC Ward Neale Medal. Once again, he would also pay for its die and first run. Ward Neale was a long-time friend and fellow GAC stalwart. Jerry was honoured and delighted to be associated with the development of a medal for the public awareness of geoscience that honoured his friend.

Jerry hung up his field boots in 1977 and became an information geologist in Direction de l’assistance à l’exploration minière of the Ministère. His role was that of providing geoscience data. Remick helped to develop a consulting room where all the information holdings of the Ministère were available for viewing.

In 1994, he created the Jerome H. Remick III Endowment Trust Fund for the Canadian Geological Foundation. According to the foundation, he donated nearly $500,000 to this fund. The purpose of the fund is to award grants, from revenues earned by the Endowment Trust Fund. The focus was for projects that furthered the development of the geosciences in Canada and promote an awareness about the role of the geosciences in Canadian society.

Although he retired in 1995, his legacy was such that in 1998 the Québec Section of the Canadian Institute of Mining, Metallurgy and Petroleum awarded its Section Medal to Jerry for his role in facilitating easier communications between members of the mining industry and the research community.

== See also ==
- Royal Canadian Numismatic Association
- Royal Canadian Numismatic Association medals and awards
