= Yvon Gariepy =

Yvon Gariepy (born July 13, 1926 in Montreal, Quebec) was the President of the Royal Canadian Mint from 1975 to 1981. In later years, he worked for Canada Post. Gariepy was a professional member of the Order of Engineers of Quebec, Professional Corporation of Urbanists of Quebec, Canadian Institute of Planners and the Institute of the Public Administration of Canada.

On June 6, 1975, Gariépy was appointed to the position. He officially took over the position from Gordon Hunter the next week and reported to the Finance Minister, John Turner. Turner became Prime Minister of Canada in 1984. At the 1975 Royal Canadian Numismatic Association Annual Convention, he announced the launching of two Olympic gold coins. Gariepy was a coin collector himself.

In 1976, Gariepy's role as Master of the Mint started to take shape. He officially opened a new RCM facility capable of producing 700 million coins per year per worker shift in Winnipeg in April. The 1976 Summer Olympics in Montreal resulted in a coin program that generated approximately $200 million in gross sales and $50 million in net profit, and the mint produced 8.4 million troy ounces of silver coins, the highest silver consumption for coins in the world.

Gariepy announced that an annual award would be bestowed to the Canadian deemed to have contributed the most to numismatic education in Canada. The award, known as the Royal Canadian Mint Award, was in the form of a sterling silver medal. A panel of numismatists, along with the Royal Canadian Mint, selected the winner, and it was presented at the Annual Royal Canadian Numismatic Association Convention.

The Gold Maple Leaf can be partly attributed to Gariepy. The RCM needed to create a product that would differentiate itself from other mints. The South African Krugerrand, the only other gold bullion coin product at the time, was 22 Karat Gold or .9167 pure. Gariepy wanted to produce a purer product, based on the knowledge that the RCM's refinery was considered the best in the world for quality. In 1979, the RCM struck a .999 pure gold coin featuring the Canadian symbol: a maple leaf. The reverse was designed by the RCM's Master Engraver, Walter Ott, while the obverse featured the effigy of Queen Elizabeth II designed by Arnold Machin.

Another change that was brought about under Gariepy's leadership was the change of the Prestige Set, a Double Dollar Set that featured a nickel dollar and a silver dollar, to a proof set. The coins were of a specimen finish (brilliant relief on a brilliant background). Under Gariepy, the Prestige Set would be changed to a Proof status. The new Proof Set was introduced in March 1981 with an issue price of $36.00 and all the coins had a frosted relief against a mirror background.

On November 30, 1981, Gariepy resigned as Master of the Mint to take a position as President with Canada Post.
