= Canadian Paper Money Society =

- Abbreviation: CPMS
- Formation: 1964
- Type: Numismatic Association
- Legal status: active
- Purpose: advocate and public voice, educator and network
- Headquarters: Ottawa, Ontario Canada
- Region served: Canada, United States and in other countries
- Official language: English French
- President: Stephen Oatway
- Affiliations: RCNA
- Website: http://www.cpmsonline.ca www.cpmsonline.ca

The Canadian Paper Money Society (CPMS) is a non-profit numismatic organization for collectors of Canadian paper money, including government and private bank issues, municipal scrip, stocks, bonds, and other forms of payment. It has members throughout Canada, the United States and in other countries.

The CPMS has its annual executive and general meetings at the RCNA convention each year.

== Newsletter and journal ==
The CPMS journal is published quarterly and contains current information such as the particulars of its affairs, registers of various banknotes, papers and studies on banknotes and other subjects, etc.

As needed for lengthy article submission, the CPMS publishes an occasional papers journal containing papers on banknotes and related studies by members and others and articles on various subjects in which the Society has an interest.

== Past presidents ==
- W.H. McDonald, FCNRS (1964-1968)
- Jack Veffer (1969-1971)
- John Phipps (1971-1975)
- Harry Eisenhauer (1975-1978)
- Myer Price (1978-1981)
- Al Bliman (1981-1983)
- Ronald Greene, FCNRS (1983-1985)
- J. Richard Becker, FCNRS (1985-1987)
- Graham Esler, FCNRS (1987-1989)
- Robert Graham, FCNRS, FRNS (1989-1991)
- Lub Wojtiw, FCNRS (1991-1993)
- Walter D. Allan, FCNRS (1993-1995)
- Geoffrey G. Bell, FCNRS (1995-1997)
- Dick Dunn (1997-1999)
- Paul Berry (1999-2001)
- Earl Salterio, FCNRS (2001-2003)
- Charles Moore (2003-2005)
- Harold Brown (2005-2007)
- Cliff Beattie (2007-2011)
- Michael Zigler (2011-2013)
- Jared Stapleton (2013-2015)
- James Williston (2015–2017)
- Ronald A Greene FCNRS (2017-2019)
- Stephen Oatway (2019–Present)
