= Royal Canadian Numismatic Association =

Nonprofit association for coin collectors

- Abbreviation: RCNA
- Formation: 1950
- Type: Numismatic Association
- Legal status: active
- Purpose: promoting fellowship, communication, education, and providing advocacy and leadership for the hobby
- Headquarters: Toronto, Ontario, Canada
- Region served: Canada
- Official language: English, French
- Affiliations: CPMS
- Website: www.rcna.ca

The Royal Canadian Numismatic Association was founded in 1950. It is a nonprofit association for coin collectors and other people interested in Canadian numismatics. It has members throughout Canada and in other countries. At times, it also works with the Canadian Association for Numismatic Education (CAFNE), an arm's length organization, which is defined by the CRA as a Canadian educational and charitable organization. CAFNE provides funding for some of the RCNA's educational seminars and publications.

Within the Royal Canadian Numismatic Association, founding member Jerome Remick suggested or initiated a number of significant changes. He recommended establishing a fellowship, encouraged the then CNA, now RCNA, to adopt a bilingual logo, and suggested creating the Young Numismatists Kit. In 1994, he established a literary award for best article in a club newsletter.

At the RCNA Annual Convention in Ottawa, ON from July 17–20, the membership ratified a name change to The Royal Canadian Numismatic Association, and the royal grant of title awarded by Queen Elizabeth II in October 2007.

Presidents

- 1950-53 Sheldon S. Carroll, F.C.N.R.S., F.R.N.S.
- 1953-55 L. J. P. Brunet
- 1955-56 Guy R. L. Potter
- 1956-59 Vincent G. Greene, F.R.N.S.
- 1959-61 C. C. Tannahill, F.C.N.R.S.
- 1961-63 Dr. John S. Wilkinson
- 1963-65 Edwin Echenberg
- 1965-67 A. Mitchell MacDonald, F.C.N.R.S.
- 1967-69 E. Victor Snell
- 1969-71 John Jay Pittman, F.R.N.S.
- 1971-73 Norman W. Williams, F.R.C.N.A., F.C.N.R.S.
- 1973-75 Louise Graham
- 1975-77 A. L. Munro
- 1977-79 James E. Charlton, F.R.C.N.A., F.C.N.R.S.
- 1979-81 Jack Veffer
- 1981-83 John Regitko, F.R.C.N.A., F.O.N.A.
- 1983-85 Geoffrey G. Bell, F.R.C.N.A., F.C.N.R.S.
- 1985-87 Stan Clute, F.R.C.N.A., F.C.N.R.S.
- 1987-89 L. H. Scoop Lewry
- 1989-91 Al Bliman
- 1991-93 Earl Salterio, F.R.C.N.A., F.C.N.R.S.
- 1993-95 Dr. Marvin Kay, F.R.C.N.A.
- 1995-99 Yvon Marquis, F.R.C.N.A.
- 1999-2001 Tom Kennedy, F.R.C.N.A.
- 2001-03 Geoffrey G. Bell, F.R.C.N.A., F.C.N.R.S.
- 2003-07 Charles D. Moore, F.R.C.N.A.
- 2007-09 Michael D. Walsh
- 2009-11 Daniel W. Gosling, F.R.C.N.A.
- 2011-13 William Waychison, F.R.C.N.A., F.C.N.R.S., F.O.N.A.
- 2013-15 Bret Evans
- 2015-19 Henry Nienhuis, F.R.C.N.A., F.C.N.R.S., F.O.N.A.
- 2019-21 Robert Forbes, F.R.C.N.A.
- 2021-23 Stephen Woodland, F.R.C.N.A., F.O.N.A.

== Conventions ==
The RCNA holds an annual convention in a different city each year. The convention includes educational seminars, both competitive and non-competitive educational display presentations, including a display by Canada's National Currency Museum (a unit of the Bank of Canada), local tours, mint tours when available, specialty club meetings, luncheons, and an awards banquet. The convention also includes a major coin show, Canada's Money Collector Show, where within a bourse room, coin and money dealers buy and sell coins, and other numismatic items, with members and the public.

=== City and year of conventions ===
- Toronto, Ontario, 1954
- Ottawa, Ontario, 1955
- London, Ontario, 1956
- Hamilton, Ontario, 1957
- Ottawa, Ontario, 1958
- Regina, Saskatchewan, 1959
- Sherbrooke, Quebec, 1960
- Hamilton, Ontario, 1961
- Detroit, Michigan, 1962
- Vancouver, British Columbia, 1963
- Halifax, Nova Scotia, 1964
- Montreal, Quebec, 1965
- Winnipeg, Manitoba, 1966
- Ottawa, Ontario, 1967
- Calgary, Alberta, 1968
- Toronto, Ontario, 1969
- Halifax, Nova Scotia, 1970
- Vancouver, British Columbia, 1971
- Toronto, Ontario, 1972
- Saskatoon, Saskatchewan, 1973
- Hamilton, Ontario, 1974
- Calgary, Alberta, 1975
- Ottawa, Ontario, 1976
- Vancouver, British Columbia, 1977
- London, Ontario, 1978
- Edmonton, Alberta, 1979
- Montreal, Quebec, 1980
- Toronto, Ontario, 1981
- Winnipeg, Manitoba, 1982
- Moncton, New Brunswick, 1983
- Hamilton, Ontario, 1984
- Regina, Saskatchewan, 1985.
- Toronto, Ontario, 1986.
- Calgary, Alberta, 1987.
- Charlottetown, Prince Edward Island, 1988.
- Quebec City, Quebec, 1989.
- Vancouver, British Columbia, 1990.
- Toronto, Ontario, 1991.
- Montreal, Quebec, 1992.
- Moncton, New Brunswick, 1993.
- Hamilton, Ontario, 1994.
- Calgary, Alberta, 1995.
- Montreal, Quebec, 1996.
- Moncton, New Brunswick, 1997.
- Edmonton, Alberta, 1998.
- Kitchener, Ontario, 1999.
- Ottawa, Ontario, 2000.
- Quebec City, Quebec, 2001.
- Vancouver, British Columbia, 2002.
- Windsor, Ontario, 2003.
- Toronto, Ontario, 2004.
- Calgary, Alberta, 2005.
- Niagara Falls, Ontario, 2006.
- Niagara Falls, Ontario, 2007.
- Ottawa, Ontario, 2008.
- Edmonton, Alberta, 2009.
- Saint John, New Brunswick, 2010.
- Windsor, Ontario, 2011.
- Calgary, Alberta, 2012.
- Winnipeg, Manitoba, 2013.
- Toronto, Ontario, 2014.
- Halifax, Nova Scotia, 2015.
- Ottawa, Ontario, 2016.
- Boucherville, Quebec, 2017.
- Toronto, Ontario, 2018.
- Calgary, Alberta, 2019.
- Halifax, Nova Scotia, 2020. (cancelled)
- Ottawa, Ontario, 2021. (cancelled)
- Ottawa, Ontario, 2022.
- Halifax, Nova Scotia, 2023.
- Boucherville, Quebec, 2024.
- Calgary, Alberta, 2025.
- Winnipeg, Manitoba, 2026.

== Publications ==
Members receive a subscription to the Canadian Numismatic Journal as part of their membership. Other RCNA publications include:

- Canadian Coins 101, a home-study course,
- A Half Century of Advancement in Numismatics, a history of the CNA.
- Royal Canadian Numismatic Correspondence Course - Part 1
- Royal Canadian Numismatic Correspondence Course - Part 2

== Library ==
Members can borrow books and other materials from the CNA's library by mail.

== Seminars and correspondence courses ==
The Royal Canadian Numismatic Association launched its first numismatic correspondence course in 1995. Coordinating Editor of this project was Paul Johnson, while the Core Committee consisted of Brian Cornwell, Scott Douglas, Dr. Marvin Kay, Paul Petch and John Regitko and with special mention of the work by Barry McIntyre. The financial support for this project was attributed to Albert Kasman, and NESA, a then available Canadian educational and charitable organization.

Since the release of the original correspondence course in 1995, demand led to the creation of a new course for collectors. In 2005, the Royal Canadian Numismatic Association launched its new correspondence course, known as the Royal Canadian Numismatic Correspondence Course - Part II. The course was also launched in grand style at the RCNA Convention in Calgary.

The Royal Canadian Numismatic Correspondence Course - Part II consists of seventeen chapters, 486 pages and hundreds of photos. The authors were chosen from the R.C.N.A. membership for their numismatic expertise of the subject covered. The chapters include the following:

Registrants who successfully complete either course I, or II, will receive a specially engraved "Certificate of Completion". Pricing for both courses is $90.00 each for R.C.N.A. members, and $132.00 for non-R.C.N.A. members [prices subject to change]. Payment is in Canadian dollars for Canadian residents and in US dollars for US residents. Others should contact the R.C.N.A.

Chapter	Course Title	Author
1	Canadian History and Numismatics	Wayne Jacobs
2	Buying and Selling Numismatic Material	Michael Walsh
3	Grading Canadian Coinage	Brian Cornwell
4	The Benefits of Organized Numismatics	Chris Boyer
5	A History of Decimal Coinage in Canada	Paul S. Berry
6	The Token - Canada's Original Currency	Scott E. Douglas
7	Canadian Paper Money for Advanced Collectors	Robert J. Graham
8	Canadian Tire "Money" as a Numismatic Collectable	Roger A. Fox
9	Canadian Commemorative and Historical Medals & Art Medals	Ronald A. Greene and Del Newbigging
10	Exonumia and Related Items	Marvin Kay, MD
11	Canadian Municipal Trade Tokens	Serge Pelletier
12	The History and Collecting of Canadian Wooden Money	Norm Belsten
13	Ancient and Medieval Coins of the Western World	Bruce R. Brace
14	Computer Literacy and Its Use in Numismatics	Bret Evans
15	An Overview of Canadian Numismatic Literature	Daniel W. Gosling
16	The Benefits of Research In Numismatics	Chris Faulkner
17	Developing Your Writing Skills and Using Illustrations In Numismatic Publications	Peter N. Moogk, Ph.D.

The RCNA also offers educational seminars at its annual convention, and each fall of the year, a workshop on grading Canadian coins and coin and paper money preservation.

== Fellows ==
In 1990, the executive committee of the C.N.A established a member service award: Fellow – Royal Canadian Numismatic Association. The criteria for this award is that a member of the Royal Canadian Numismatic Association must have performed a worthy service judged to be of a direct benefit to the association. Nominations are made by members, and the recipients are decided by The Awards and Medals Committee. The committee proceeds by presenting its choices, up to 5 each year, at the annual convention. Fellows in the Royal Canadian Numismatic Association are authorized the use of the letters, F.R.C.N.A. to follow their name. The first awards were made at the 1991 C.N.A. Convention in Toronto, Ontario.

Members awarded F.R.C.N.A. 1991 to date:

Fellow	Year Bestowed
1991	Jerome Remick
1991	John Regitko
1992	Bill Waychison
1992	Yvon Marquis
1993	Kenneth Prophet
1994	Earl Salterio
1996	Tom Kennedy
1996	Barry Uman
1997	Paul Johnson
1997	Al V. Munro
1998	Geoffrey Bell
1998	Norman Williams
1999	Chris Boyer
1999	Tom Masters
2000	Stan Clute
2000	Ingrid Smith
2002	Paul Petch
2002	Jim Charlton
2003	Marvin Kay
2004	Dan Gosling
2004	George Fraser
2005	R. Brian Cornwell
2005	Les Copan
2007	William 'Bill' Kamb
2007	Michael 'Stan' Turrini
2008	Fred Freeman
2008	Charles Moore
2008	Tom Rogers
2009	Vic Schoff
2009	Geraldine Chimirri-Russell
2010	William K. Cross
2010	Henry Nienhuis
2011	Margaret Clarke
2011	Tom Clarke
2012	Barrie Renwick
2012	Scott Douglas
2013	James Williston
2013	Serge Pelletier

== Awards ==
The RCNA Annual Convention bestows a number of awards. The list of awards is as follows:

- Best of Show Award - best exhibit, judged by a panel of volunteers assembled by Tim Henderson, Chairman R.C.N.A. Awards & Medals Committee.
- "Fellow of the R.C.N.A." Award - see above
- Guy Potter Literary Award - the original R.C.N.A. Literary Award was renamed in 1978 to honour the memory of Guy R.L. Potter, one of the founders of the Canadian Numismatic Association.
- J. Douglas Ferguson Award - presented to the living numismatist who has made the greatest contribution during the year to the advancement of numismatics in Canada by research, writing, publishing, or other means
- Jean Bullen Award - established in 2004 as an annual presentation for the best exhibit of Canadian coins displayed by a member at the R.C.N.A. Convention
- Jerome H. Remick III Literary Award - at the bequest of Jerome Remick, it is given annually to the author of the best numismatic article published in a local Canadian coin club newsletter during the previous calendar year

Jerome H Remick III Literary Award Winners

Year	Winner	Year Awarded	Location
1994	Guy Veillette	1995	Calgary
1995	Jean Luc Giroux	1996	Montreal
1996	Jean Luc Giroux	1997	Moncton
1997	Yvon Marquis	1998	Edmonton
1998	Ian Hunter	1999	Kitchener
1999	Not Awarded	2000	Ottawa
2000	David Bergeron	2001	Québec City
2001	Geraldine Chimirri-Russell	2002	Vancouver
2002	Ken Cameron	2003	Windsor
2003	Wayne Jacobs	2004	Toronto
2004	Troy Carlson	2005	Calgary
2005	Pierre Bouchard	2006	Niagara Falls
2006	Tolling Jennings	2007	Niagara Falls
2007	Ron Cheek	2008	Ottawa
2008	Geraldine Chimirri-Russell	2009	Edmonton
2009	Robert J. Graham	2010	Saint John
2010	Ron Cheek	2011	Windsor
2011	Serge Pelletier	2012	Calgary
2012	David Bergeron	2013	Winnipeg

- Louise Graham Memorial Club of the Year Award - offered annually to R.C.N.A. member clubs entering a competition to acknowledge the club having made the most significant overall achievement on behalf of its members and of the hobby

Louise Graham Memorial Club of the Year Award Winners

Year	Winner	Year Awarded	Location
1986	Calgary Numismatic Society	1987	Calgary
1987	Regina Coin Club	1988	Charlottetown
1988	Regina Coin Club	1989	Quebec City
1989	Le Club de Numismates du Bas St. Laurent (Rimouski, Québec)	1990	Vancouver
1990	Calgary Numismatic Society	1991	Toronto
1991	L'Association des Collectionneurs de Monnaies des Laurentides (St-Jerome, Quebec)	1992	Montreal
1992	Calgary Numismatic Society	1993	Moncton
1993	Calgary Numismatic Society	1994	Hamilton
1994	Edmonton Coin Club	1995	Calgary
1995	Taylor Evans Coin Society (Guelph, Ontario)	1996	Montreal
1996	Waterloo Coin Society	1997	Moncton
1997	Edmonton Numismatic Society	1998	Edmonton
1998	Edmonton Numismatic Society	1999	Kitchener
1999	Not Awarded	2000	Ottawa
2000	Calgary Numismatic Society	2001	Québec City
2001	No Entries	2002	Vancouver
2002	Edmonton Numismatic Society	2003	Windsor
2003	Windsor Coin Club	2004	Toronto
2004	Le Club de Numismates du Bas St-Laurent (Rimouski, Québec)	2005	Calgary
2005	Calgary Numismatic Society	2006	Niagara Falls
2006	Calgary Numismatic Society	2007	Niagara Falls
2007	Regina Coin Club	2008	Ottawa
2008	City of Ottawa Coin Club	2009	Edmonton
2009	Waterloo Coin Society	2010	Saint John
2010	Calgary Numismatic Society	2011	Windsor
2011	Windsor Coin Club	2012	Calgary
2012	Windsor Coin Club	2013	Winnipeg

- Paul Fiocca Award The Paul Fiocca Award is the highest distinction presented by The Royal Canadian Numismatic Association, and the second highest award in Canadian Numismatics. The award is named after the former publisher of Canadian Coin News, Paul Fiocca. It is presented annually for “Long term meritorious service or major contributions to the RCNA” and is an award not just to recognize the elite of the hobby, but any individual who may have worked behind the scenes, often for many decades, for the betterment of the Association.

This award is strictly an RCNA award for RCNA members, and is not to be confused with the J. Douglas Ferguson award, the highest award in Canadian numismatics, which does not require membership in the RCNA.

Paul Fiocca was publisher of Canadian Coin News from 1989 until his retirement, remaining a supporter of Canadian numismatics and giving freely of his own time and expertise. He served as editor of The CN Journal for a number of years, and was serving the RCNA in that capacity at the time of his death in 2007. The award that bears his name is funded by donations from Trajan Publishing Corporation and others that were his friends.

The President of the Association presents the Paul Fiocca Award at each year's annual RCNA convention to a Royal Canadian Numismatic Association (RCNA) member.

The first recipient is James E. Charlton, one of Canada's most distinguished numismatists. The announcement was made July 19 during the annual awards banquet of The Royal Canadian Numismatic Association and the actual presentation was made several days later in Grimsby, Ontario. Mr. Charlton, the current honorary president of the RCNA, is often referred to as the dean of Canadian numismatics, or the father of modern numismatics in Canada. Charlton is best known for his Standard Catalogue of Canadian Coins. While the Certificate of Award could have listed Mr. Charlton's significant contributions to the Association, it reads simply “For Long Term, Meritorious Service to the R.C.N.A.” The criteria for the award is for long-term, meritorious service or major contributions to the RCNA.

Paul Fiocca Award Winners

Year	Winner	Home Town
2008	James E. Charlton	Grimsby ON
2009	Geoffrey G. Bell	Shediac NB
2010	Tim G. Henderson	Florenceville NB
2011	Dr. Marvin Kay	North York ON
2012	Ronald Greene	Victoria BC
2013	Norman Williams	Vancouver BC

- President's Awards - The President has the right to recognize supporters, whether individuals or corporations, for outstanding support of the Association.

== See also ==
- Royal Canadian Numismatic Association medals and awards
- Jerome Remick
- Philately
