= William Scully Ltd. =

Coordinates: 45.53995°N 73.54997°W

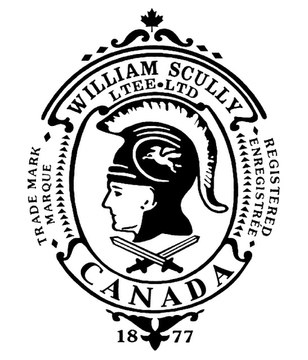
- Company type: Private
- Founded: 1877
- Founder: William Scully, Esq.
- Headquarters: 2090 Moreau, Montreal, QC, Canada
- Products: Uniform accoutrements and accessories
- Website: https://www.williamscully.ca

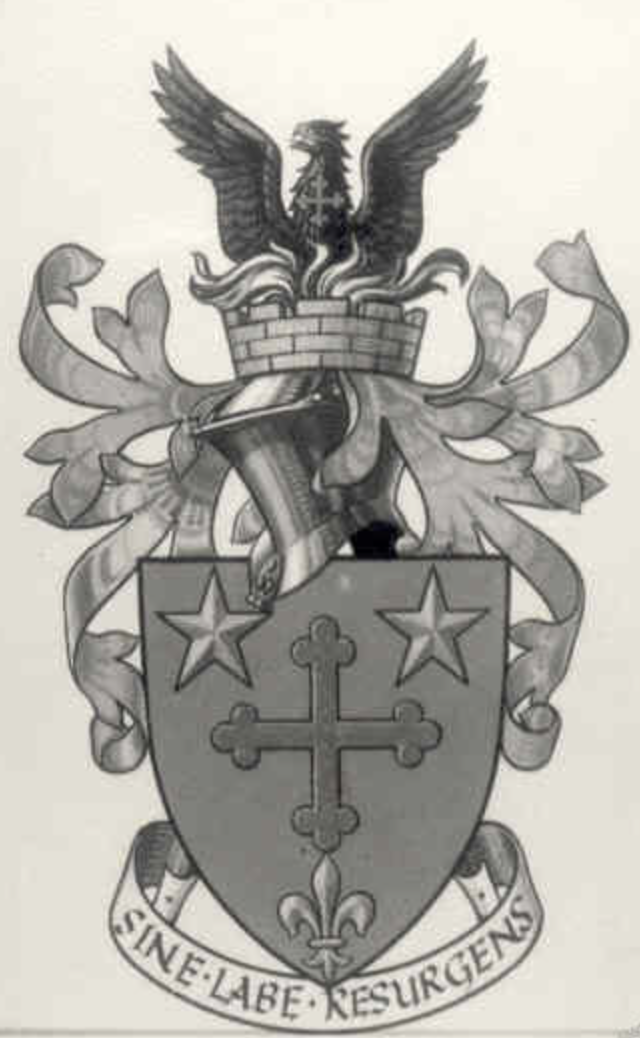
Scully Arms - Heraldic achievement of Scully family: Out of a Mural Crown Ppr., A Phoenix in Flames, Also Ppr., Charged on the Breast with a Cross Bottonnée Or. Gules Red Gold, Cross, Mullet star of five points, Fleur de Lyse. Latin Motto: Latin: sine labe resurgens, lit. ‘rise without scar

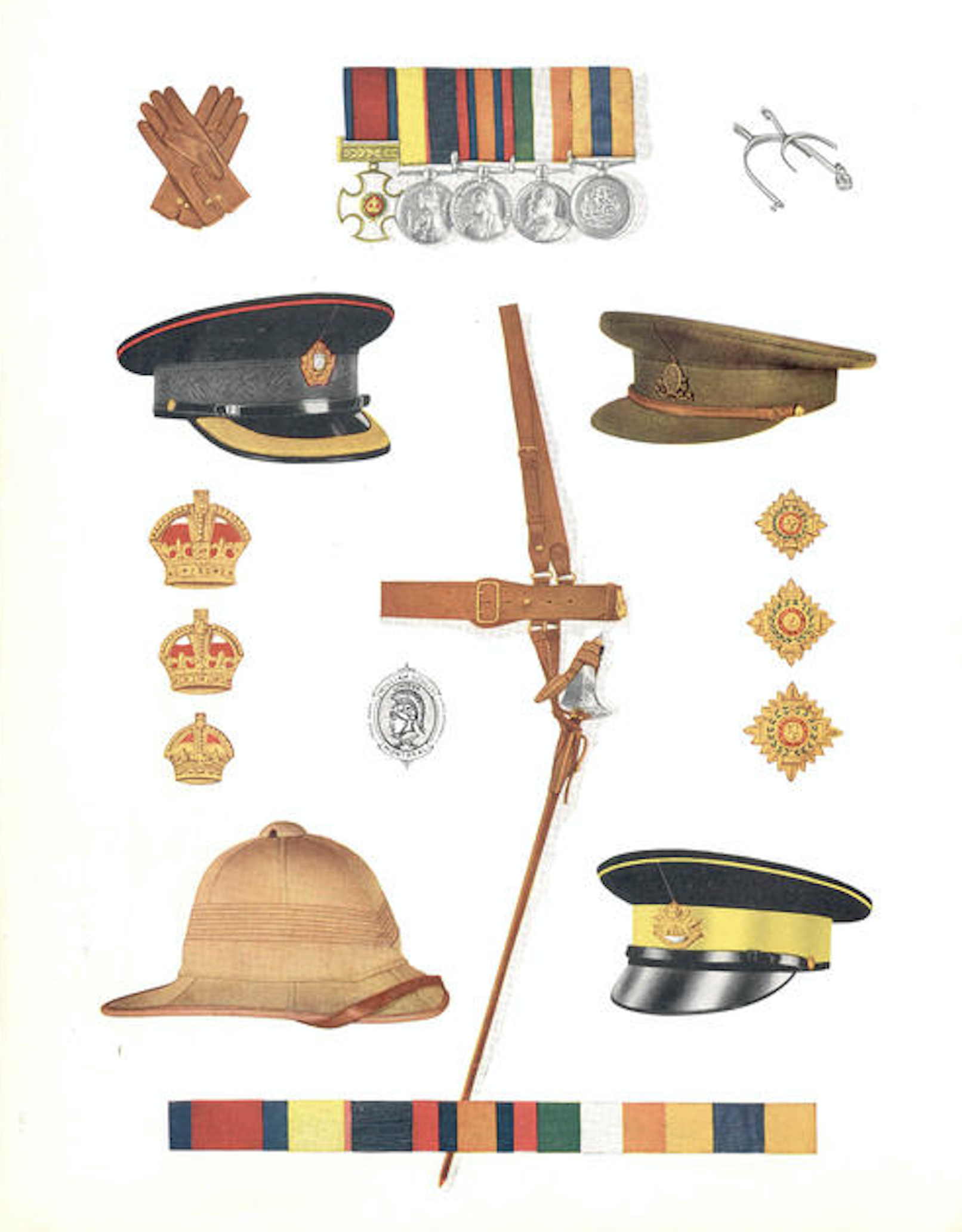
The Canadian Uniform

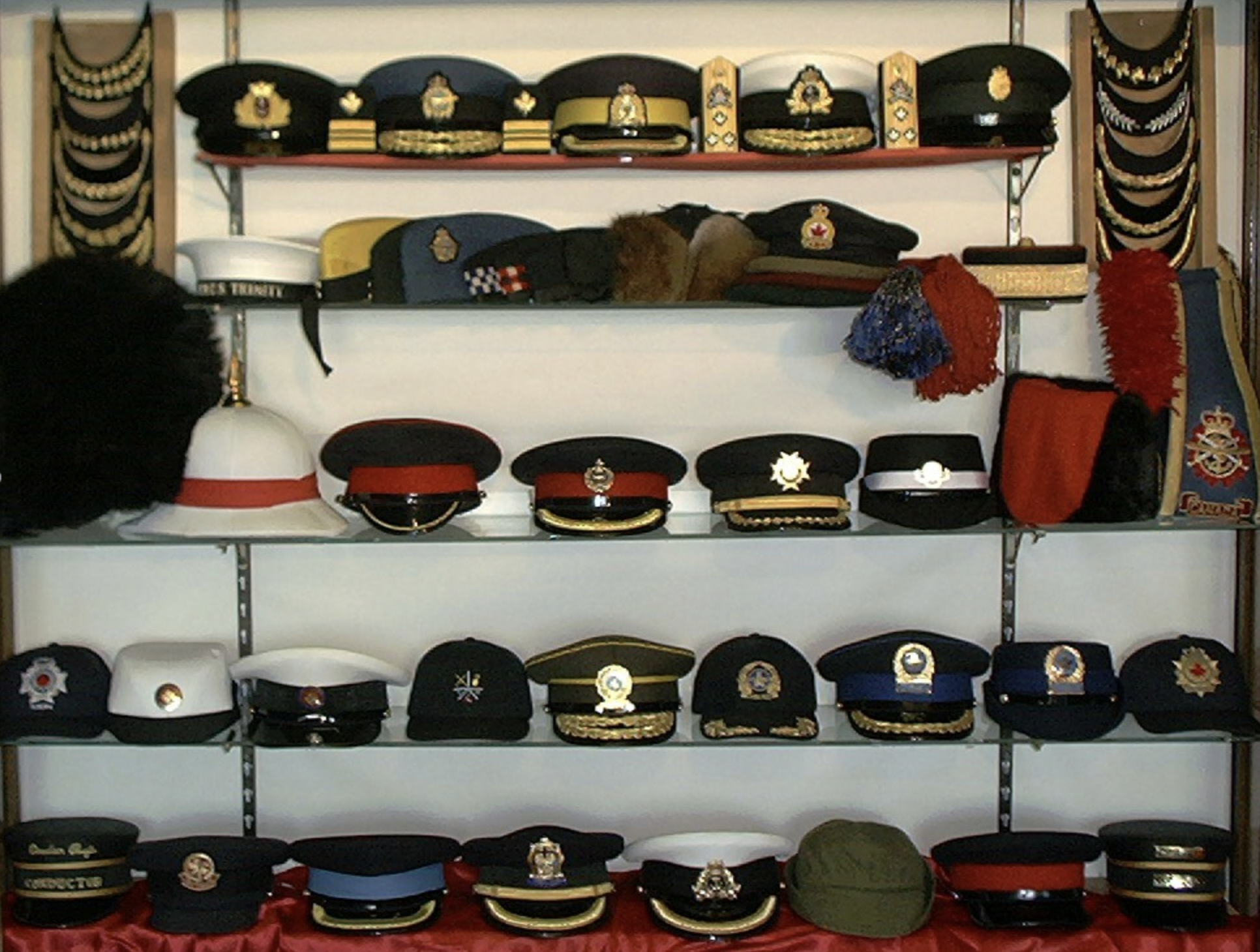
Uniform Headwear and Badges

William Scully Ltd. is a Canadian uniform accoutrements manufacturer based in Montreal, QC, Canada, founded in 1877 by William Scully, a British manufacturers’ Canadian Representative, in Toronto. He was the first Canadian representative of London's Welsh Margetson and Sons. The company remains a family owned and operated firm after five generations.

== History ==
In 1908, William Scully opened a factory in Montreal with the encouragement of Sir Wilfrid Laurier and with the regular orders assured by Sir Frederick Borden, Minister of Militia. The authorities of the various departments at Ottawa wanted to have as many of their requirements as possible manufactured in Canada, therefore William Scully made a visit to Great Britain, where he purchased the necessary machinery, latest designs and at the same time secured the services of thoroughly qualified foremen to take charge of the respective departments. It was the first and only firm in Canada that started manufacturing uniform caps, helmets, uniform buttons and metal badges and accouterments for Militia, The Royal Canadian Navy, police and other forces. William Scully guaranteed the Canadian government that his every product would equal or surpass the products of the finest British Houses.

The firm remained on University St. until it was expropriated in 1958 by the city to make way for Place Ville Marie. The firm moved to Craig St., and again in 1968 to its current location on Moreau St. in Montreal's east end, where the firm operates a 25,000 sq. ft. manufacturing plant.

William Scully Ltd. acquired J.R. Gaunt (Canada) in 1984.

The firm was tailor to Camilien Houde, General McNaughton, the first Governor General to be outfitted and uniformed in Canada – Lord Alexander. The firm was headwear supplier to Haille Selassie, Emperor of Ethiopia, whose dress uniform was tailored in 1955. It also outfitted President Nyerere's Tanzanian Army. The first Lieut. Governor's dress uniform made in Canada, both the tailoring and the gold hand embroidery was made on University Street. Today, the company holds contracts with units across Canada for the supply of uniform accoutrements and accessories.

Following the death of the company's founder, William Scully Esq. in 1921, his son Col. William Gladstone Scully, R.C.A., 2nd Heavy Field Battery, became president. Upon Willam G. Scully's death in 1947, his brother Sgt. Vincent England Scully, 1st Canadian Tank Battalion, C.E.F., became president. In 1957, Maj. Vincent G. Scully R.C.A., son of Col. William G. Scully became president. His sons, Dr. Richard Stuart Scully served as vice-president from 1967 to 1976, and his son John H. Scully served as a director from 1976 to 2014. The current President is William B. Scully who became president in 2001.

Regimental Badges, regimental postcards, and other military accoutrements and accessories from the Boer War forward are displayed in military museums including the Canadian War Museum.
