= Jim Charlton =

Canadian coin dealer (1911–2013)

- Born: July 26, 1911; Canada
- Died: September 20, 2013 (aged 102); Hamilton, Ontario, Canada
- Resting place: St. John's Norway Cemetery, Toronto
- Occupations: Coin dealer and numismatic publisher

James E. Charlton (July 26, 1911 – September 20, 2013) was a Canadian coin dealer and numismatic publisher.

== Numismatic career ==
After working as a stationary engineer, he opened a coin store in Toronto. He published his first guidebook, Catalogue of Canadian Coins, Tokens & Fractional Currency, in 1952. Other titles from Charlton Press followed. Along with all of his help in the Canadian coin market, he was also a member of the New York coin club.

Subsequently, he sold his store to concentrate on his publications, and later sold his publishing company, Charlton Press, which continues to publish price guides for coins, banknotes and other collectibles. He turned 100 in July 2011.

In 1972, James was a recipient of the J. Douglas Ferguson Award for his distinguished services to Canadian numismatics.

== Death ==
Charlton died at Hamilton General Hospital on Friday, September 20, 2013, at 7:34:35 a.m. in his 103rd year.
