= Bourchier =

- Pronunciation: /ˈbaʊtʃər/

Origin
- Region of origin: England and Wales; Ireland

Bourchier is an English surname, from French Boursier, keeper of the purse. Bourchier is the Norman pronunciation.

== The Barons Bourchier, Barons Berners, Barons FitzWarin, Earls of Essex and Earls of Bath ==
Arms of Bourchier: Argent, a cross engrailed gules between four water bougets sable

- Robert Bourchier, 1st Baron Bourchier (died 1349), son of John Bourchier (died 1329), Judge of the Court of Common Pleas
  - John Bourchier, 2nd Baron Bourchier (died 1400)
    - Bartholomew Bourchier, 3rd Baron Bourchier (died 1409)
      - Elizabeth Bourchier, 4th Baroness Bourchier (c. 1399 – 1433)
      First husband: Hugh Stafford, jure uxoris 4th Baron Bourchier, later 1st Baron Stafford (died 1420)
      Second husband: Lewis Robessart, jure uxoris 4th Baron Bourchier (died 1430)
  - Sir William Bourchier (died 1375)
    - William Bourchier, 1st Count of Eu (1374–1420)
      - Henry Bourchier, 1st Viscount Bourchier, 1st Earl of Essex, 5th Baron Bourchier (c. 1404 – 1483), Baroness Elizabeth's second cousin.
        - William, Viscount Bourchier (d. bef. 1480)
          - Henry Bourchier, 2nd Earl of Essex, 2nd Viscount Bourchier, 6th Baron Bourchier (c. 1472 – 1540)
            - Anne Bourchier, 7th Baroness Bourchier (died 1571)
          - Cecile Bourchier
            - Walter Devereux, 1st Viscount Hereford (1488–1558)
              - Sir Richard Devereux (died 1547)
                - Walter Devereux, 1st Earl of Essex, 8th Baron Bourchier (1541–1576)
                  - Robert Devereux, 2nd Earl of Essex, 9th Baron Bourchier (1566–1601)
                    - Robert Devereux, 3rd Earl of Essex, 10th Baron Bourchier (1591–1646), abeyant.
        - Humphrey Bourchier, 1st Baron Cromwell (died 1471)
        - Sir John Bourchier (died 1495), jure uxoris 6th Baron Ferrers of Groby
      - Eleanor Bourchier (c. 1417 – 1474), Duchess of Norfolk, as wife to John de Mowbray, 3rd Duke of Norfolk.
      - William Bourchier, jure uxoris Baron Fitzwaryn (c. 1412 – bef. 1469)
        - Fulk Bourchier, 10th Baron FitzWarin (1445–1479)
          - John Bourchier, 1st Earl of Bath, 11th Baron FitzWarin (1470–1539)
            - John Bourchier, 2nd Earl of Bath, 12th Baron FitzWarin (1499–1561), commissioner at the trial of Lady Jane Grey.
              - Sir John Bourchier, Lord FitzWarin (1529–1556)
                - William Bourchier, 3rd Earl of Bath, 13th Baron FitzWarin (bef.1557–1623)
                  - Edward Bourchier, 4th Earl of Bath, 14th Baron FitzWarin (1590–1636)
                - Hon. Sir George Bourchier (c. 1535 – 1605)
                  - Henry Bourchier, 5th Earl of Bath (1593–1654)
      - Thomas Bourchier (c. 1404 – 1486), bishop, later cardinal
      - John Bourchier, 1st Baron Berners (died 1471)
        - Sir Humphrey Bourchier (died 1471), co-Constable of Windsor Castle
          - John Bourchier, 2nd Baron Berners (1467–1533), one of Henry VIII's Chancellors of the Exchequer
          - Margaret Bourchier (c. 1468 – c. 1551/52), made Baroness Bryan in her own right by Henry VIII, mother of his mistress, Elizabeth Carew
          - Anne Bourchier, Baroness Dacre (1470–1530)
        - Sir Thomas Bourchier (died 1510), Constable of Windsor Castle

== Other ==
- Arthur Bourchier (1863–1927), English actor
- Bourchier Wrey, 6th Baronet (c. 1715 – 1784), politician
- Claud Thomas Bourchier (1831–1877), English officer
- James David Bourchier (1850–1920), Irish journalist and political activist
- John Bourchier (regicide) (1595–1660), English Puritan and regicide of Charles I
- John Bourchier (politician) (1929–2017), Australian politician
- Murray Bourchier (1881–1937), Australian soldier and politician
