= John Bourchier =

John Bourchier may refer to:

- John de Bourchier (died c. 1330), English judge
- John Bourchier, 2nd Baron Bourchier (died 1400), English peer
- John Bourchier, 1st Baron Berners (died 1474), English peer
- John Bourchier, 2nd Baron Berners (1467–1533), one of Henry VIII's Chancellors of the Exchequer
- John Bourchier, 1st Earl of Bath (1470–1539)
- John Bourchier (bishop-designate) (died in/around 1577)
- Sir John Bourchier (died 1495) (c. 1438–1495), Baron Ferrers of Groby in right of his wife Elizabeth Grey, Baroness Ferrers of Groby
- John Bourchier, 2nd Earl of Bath (1499–1561)
- John Bourchier (MP for Hull) (1567–1626), MP for Kingston upon Hull, 1614
- John Bourchier (regicide) (c. 1595–1660), English Puritan and regicide of Charles I
- John Bourchier (politician) (1929–2017), Australian politician
