= Token coin =

Trade token

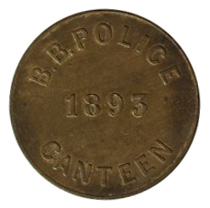
A Bechuanaland Border Police canteen token

In numismatics, token coins or trade tokens are coin-like objects used instead of coins. The field of token coins is part of exonumia and token coins are token money. Their denomination is shown or implied by size, color or shape. They are often made of cheaper metals like copper, pewter, aluminium, brass and tin, or non-metals like bakelite, leather and porcelain.

A legal tender coin is issued by a governmental authority and is freely exchangeable for goods. A token coin has a narrower utility and is issued by a private entity. In many instances, token coins have become obsolete due to the use of cash, payment cards, stored value cards or other electronic transactions.

== Trade ==
Coin-like objects from the Roman Empire called spintriae have been interpreted as an early form of token. Their functions are not documented, but they appear to have been brothel tokens or possibly gaming tokens.

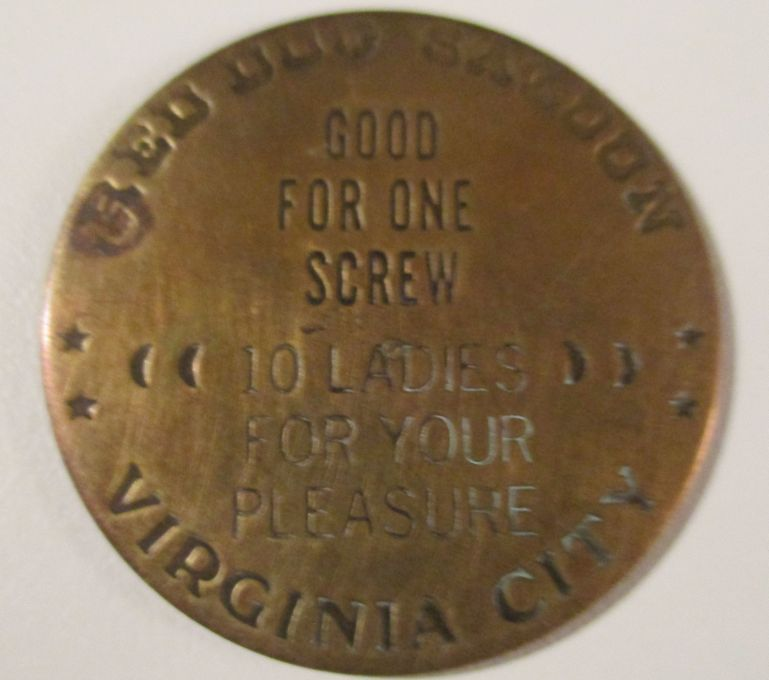
A 19th century brothel token from the Red Dog Saloon

Medieval English monasteries issued tokens to pay for services from outsiders. These tokens circulated in nearby villages, where they were called "Abbot's money". Also, counters called jetons were used as small change without official blessing.

From the 17th to the early 19th century in the British Isles (and also elsewhere in the British Empire) and North America, tokens were commonly issued by merchants in times of acute shortage of coins of the state. These tokens were in effect a pledge redeemable in goods, but not necessarily for currency. These tokens never received official sanction from government but were accepted and circulated quite widely.

In England, the production of copper farthings was permitted by royal licence in the first few decades of the 17th century, but production ceased during the English Civil War and a great shortage of small change resulted. This shortage was felt more keenly because of the rapid growth of trade in the towns and cities, and this in turn prompted both local authorities and merchants to issue tokens.

These tokens were most commonly made of copper or brass, but pewter, lead and occasionally leather tokens are also found. Most were not given a specific denomination and were intended to substitute for farthings, but there are also a large number of halfpenny and sometimes penny tokens. Halfpenny and penny tokens usually, but not always, bear the denomination on their face.

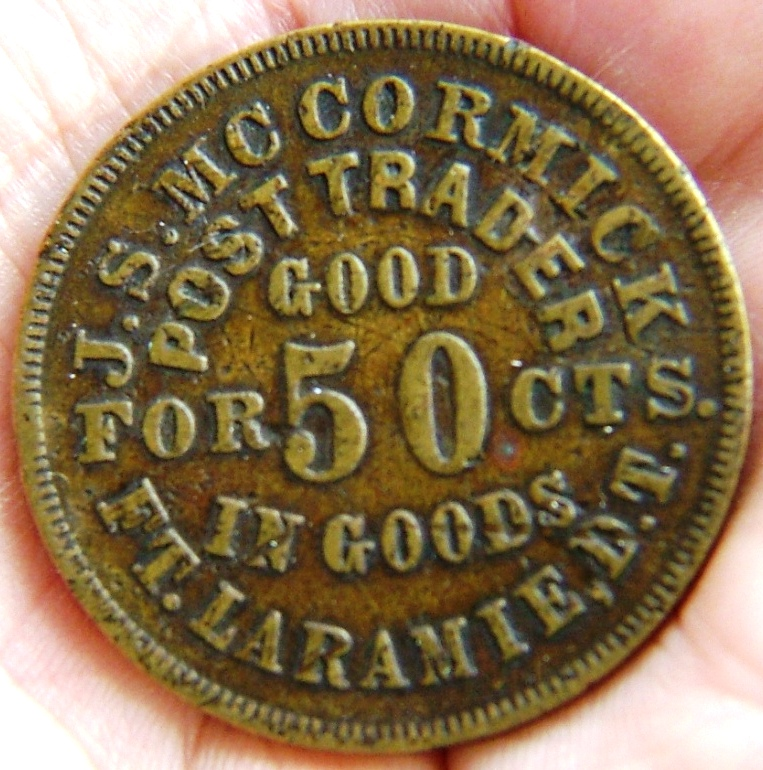
Brass trade token from Fort Laramie, Dakota Territory

Most such tokens show the issuer's full name or initials. Where initials were shown, it was common practice to show three initials: the first names of husband and wife and their surname. Tokens would also normally indicate the merchant establishment, either by name or by picture. Most were round, but they are also found in square, heart or octagonal shapes.

Thousands of towns and merchants issued these tokens from 1648 until 1672, when official production of farthings resumed, and private production was suppressed.

There were again coin shortages in the late 18th century, when the British Royal Mint almost ceased production. Merchants once again produced tokens, but they were then machine made and typically larger than their 17th century predecessors, with values of a halfpenny or more. While many were used in trade, they were also produced for advertising and political purposes, and some series were produced for the primary purpose of sale to collectors. These tokens are usually known as Conder tokens, after the writer of the first reference book on them.

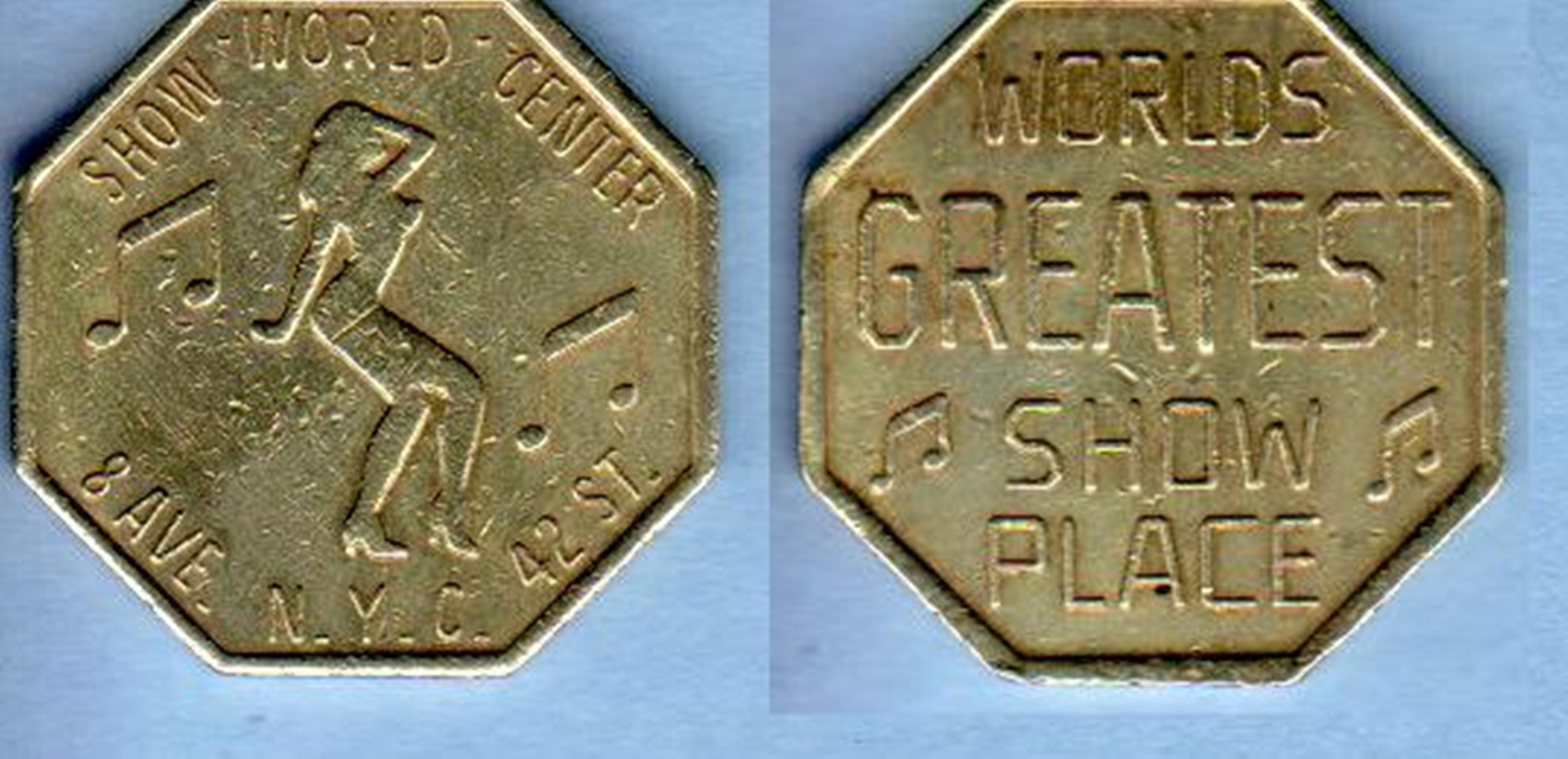
Show World Center token, New York City, c. 1990

These were issued by merchants in payment for goods with the agreement that they would be redeemed in goods to an equivalent value at the merchants' own outlets. The tokens play a role of convenience, allowing the seller to receive his goods at a rate and time convenient to himself, and the merchant to tie the holder of the token coin to his shop.

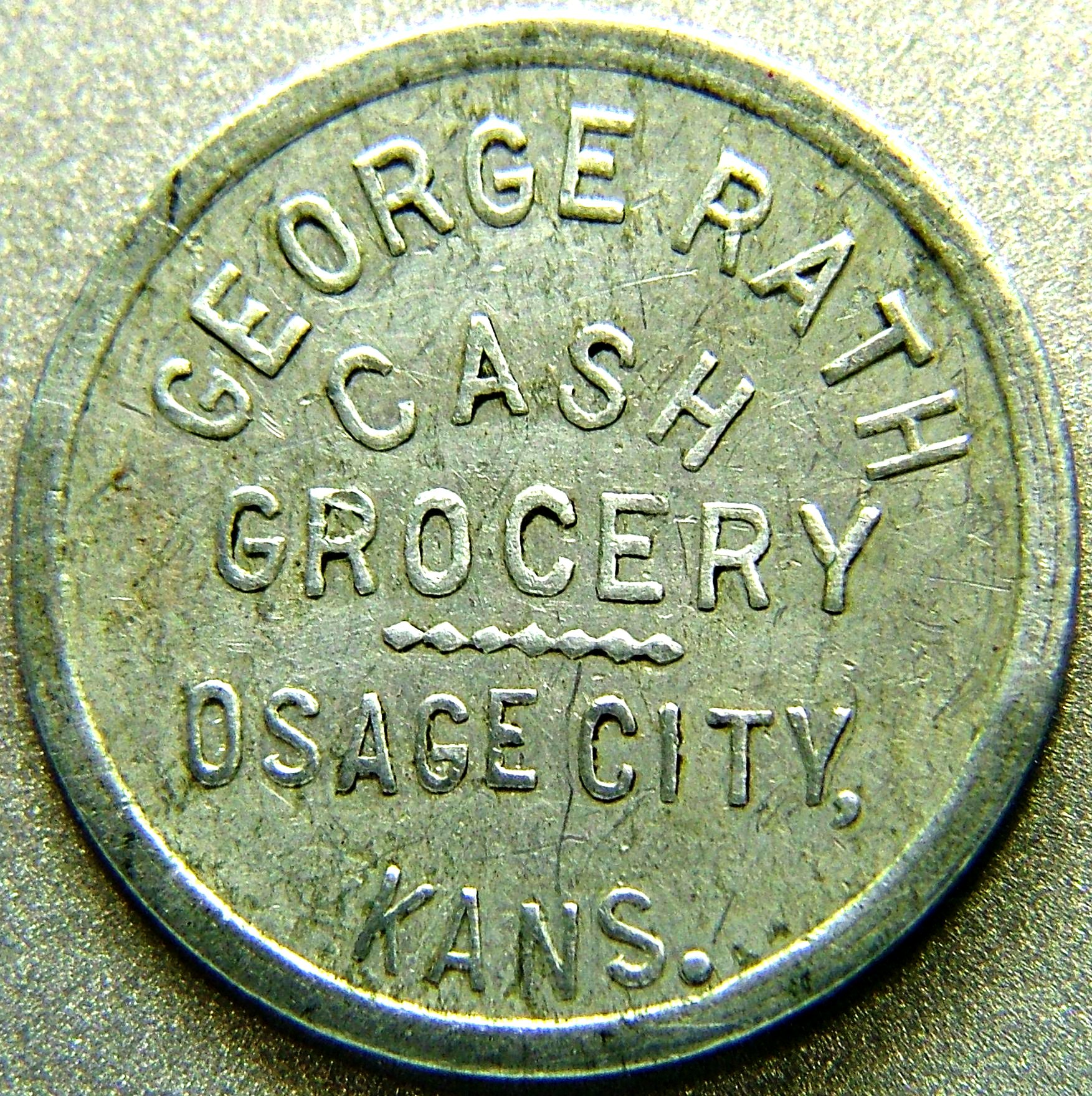
Aluminum trade token from Osage City, Kansas

In North America, tokens were originally issued by merchants from the 18th century in regions where national or local colonial governments did not issue enough small denomination coins for circulation. In the United States, Hard times tokens issued from 1832 to 1844 and Civil War tokens issued in the 1860s made up for shortages of official money.

Tokens were also used as company scrip to pay labor for use only in company stores owned by the employers.

The collecting of trade tokens is part of the field of exonumia, and includes other types of tokens, including transit tokens, encased cents, and many others. In a narrow sense, trade tokens are "good for" tokens, issued by merchants. Generally, they have a merchant's name or initials, sometimes a town and state, and a value legend (such as "good for 5¢" or other denomination) somewhere on the token. Merchants that issued tokens included general stores, grocers, department stores, dairies, meat markets, drug stores, saloons, bars, taverns, barbers, coal mines, lumber mills and many other businesses. The era of 1870 through 1920 marked the highest use of "trade tokens" in the United States, spurred by the proliferation of small stores in rural areas. There were thousands of small general and merchandise stores all over the United States, and many of them used trade tokens to promote trade and extend credit to customers. Aluminum tokens almost always date after 1890, when low-cost production began. Wooden nickels, another type of token, were usually issued by a merchant or bank as a promotion, sometimes redeemable for a specific item.

== Slot machines ==
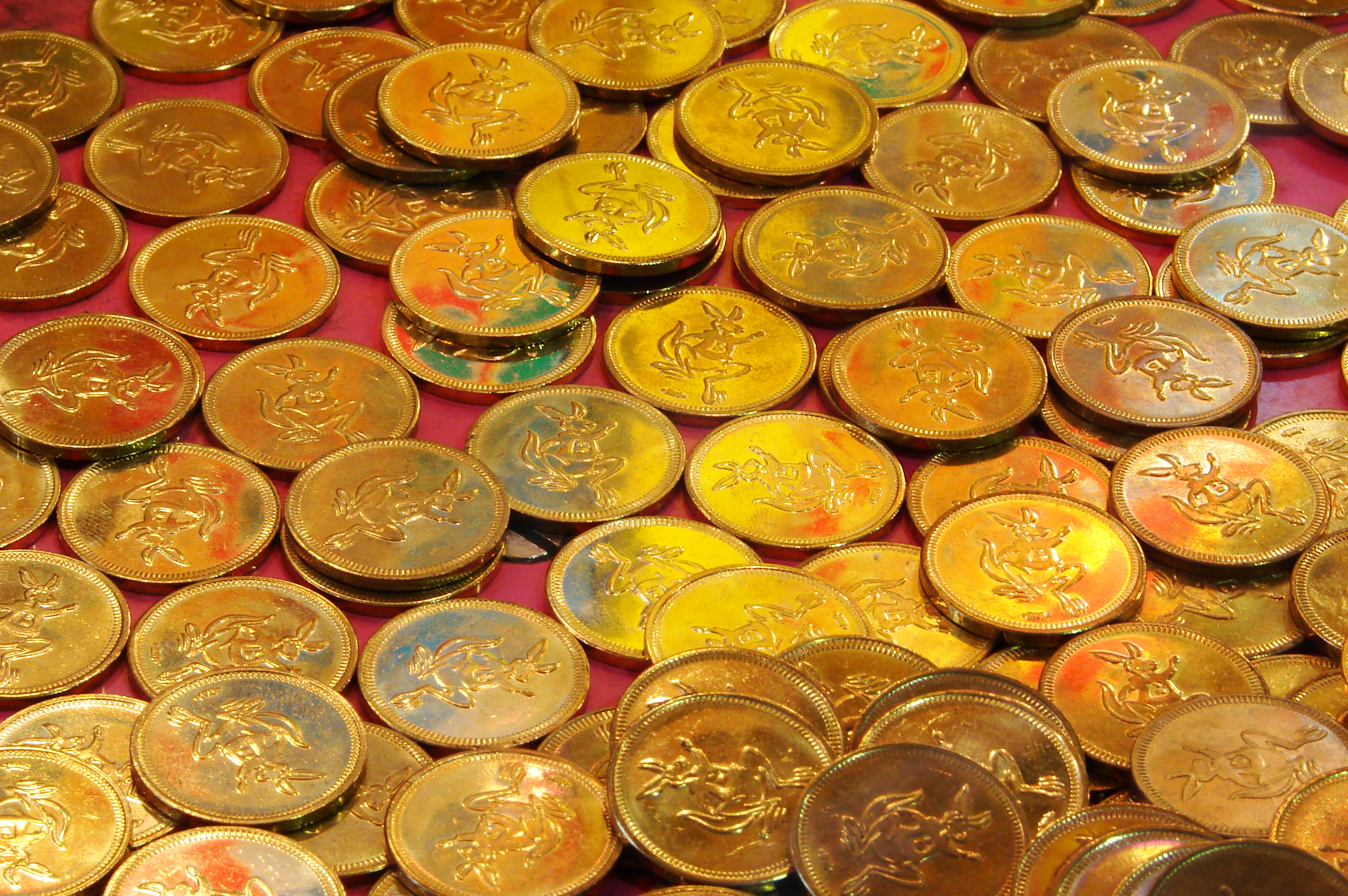
Token coins in an arcade game

Metal token coins are used in lieu of cash in some coin-operated arcade games and casino slot machines. Money is exchanged for the token coins or chips in a casino where they may be interchangeable with money.

In many jurisdictions, casinos are not permitted to use currency in slot machines, necessitating tokens for smaller denominations. After the increase in the value of silver ended the use of silver coins in the United States around 1964, casinos rushed to find a substitute, as most slot machines at that time used that particular coin. The Nevada State Gaming Control Board consulted with the U.S. Treasury, and casinos were soon allowed to start using their own tokens to operate their slot machines. The Franklin Mint was the main minter of casino tokens at that time.

In 1971, many casinos adopted the Eisenhower Dollar for use in machines and on tables. When that coin was replaced with the Susan B. Anthony dollar in 1979, most casinos reinstituted tokens, fearing confusion with quarters and not wishing to extensively retool their slot machines. Casinos which still use tokens in slot machines still use Eisenhower-sized ones.

Tokens are being phased out by many casinos in favor of coinless machines which accept banknotes and print receipts for payout. These receipts, abbreviated "TITOs" for ticket-in, ticket-out, can also be inserted into the machines. In video arcades, they are also being phased out in favor of magnetic cards, which can also count how many tickets one has, allowing arcades to also do away with paper tickets.

== Other uses ==
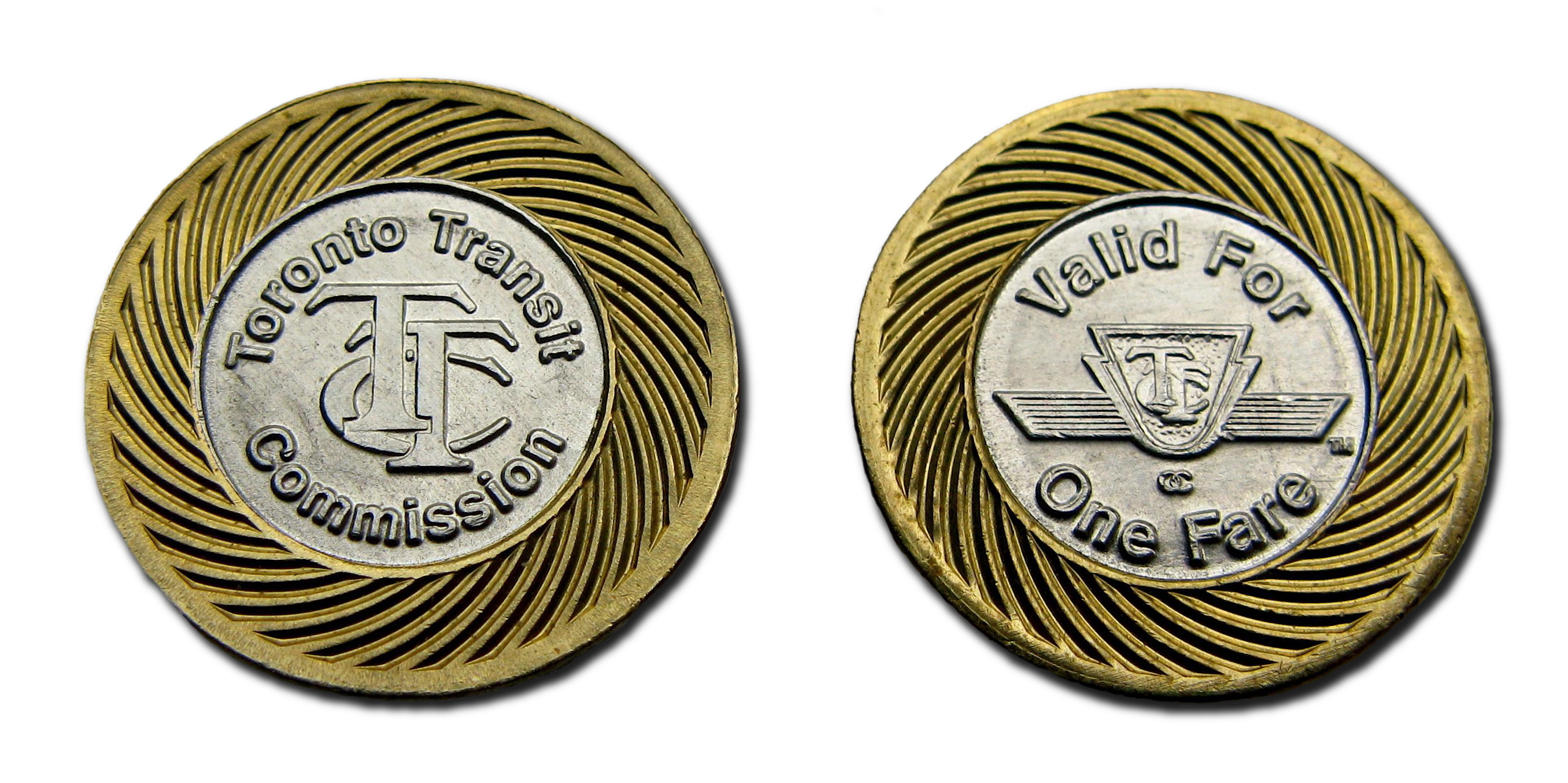
Obverse and reverse of a Toronto Transit Commission (TTC) single-ride token (designed in 2006); now replaced by the inter-regional Presto smart card.

- Car washes: their use has decreased in favor of cash or credit cards.
- Communion tokens were given to church members passing a religious test required for entry prior to the day of communion. While mostly in Scotland, some U.S. churches used communion tokens. Generally, these were pewter, often cast by the minister in church-owned molds.
- Military "pogs": Cardboard or plastic military tokens ("pogs") were used as a substitute for coins for United States military overseas. Pogs are lighter and less expensive to ship. The Army and Air Force Exchange Service officials made pogs in denominations of 5, 10, and 25 cents and they feature images of troops, aircraft, comic book characters, etc.
- Parking garages
- Pay toilets

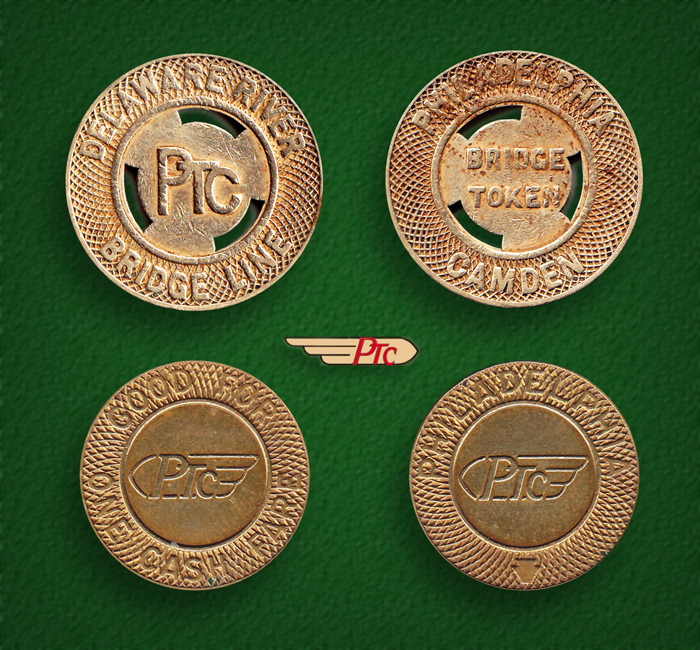
Philadelphia Transportation Company transit tokens (1940–68)

- Railways and public transport agencies used fare tokens for years, to sell rides in advance at a discount, or to allow patrons to use turnstiles geared only to take tokens (as opposed to coins, currency, or fare cards). Some transport organizations still offer their own tokens for bus and subway services, although the use of computer-readable tickets, credit cards or fare cards has replaced these in most areas.
- Shopping cart rental
- Telephone tokens were used in public telephone booths in countries with unstable currency so that the price could be easily adjusted. This system was in effect in Brazil until 1997 when magnetic cards were introduced. The practice was also discontinued in Israel, leading to a trend of wearing the devalued tokens as necklaces.
- Tolls for toll bridges, toll tunnels, and toll roads: largely phased out due to electronic toll collection.
- Video arcades

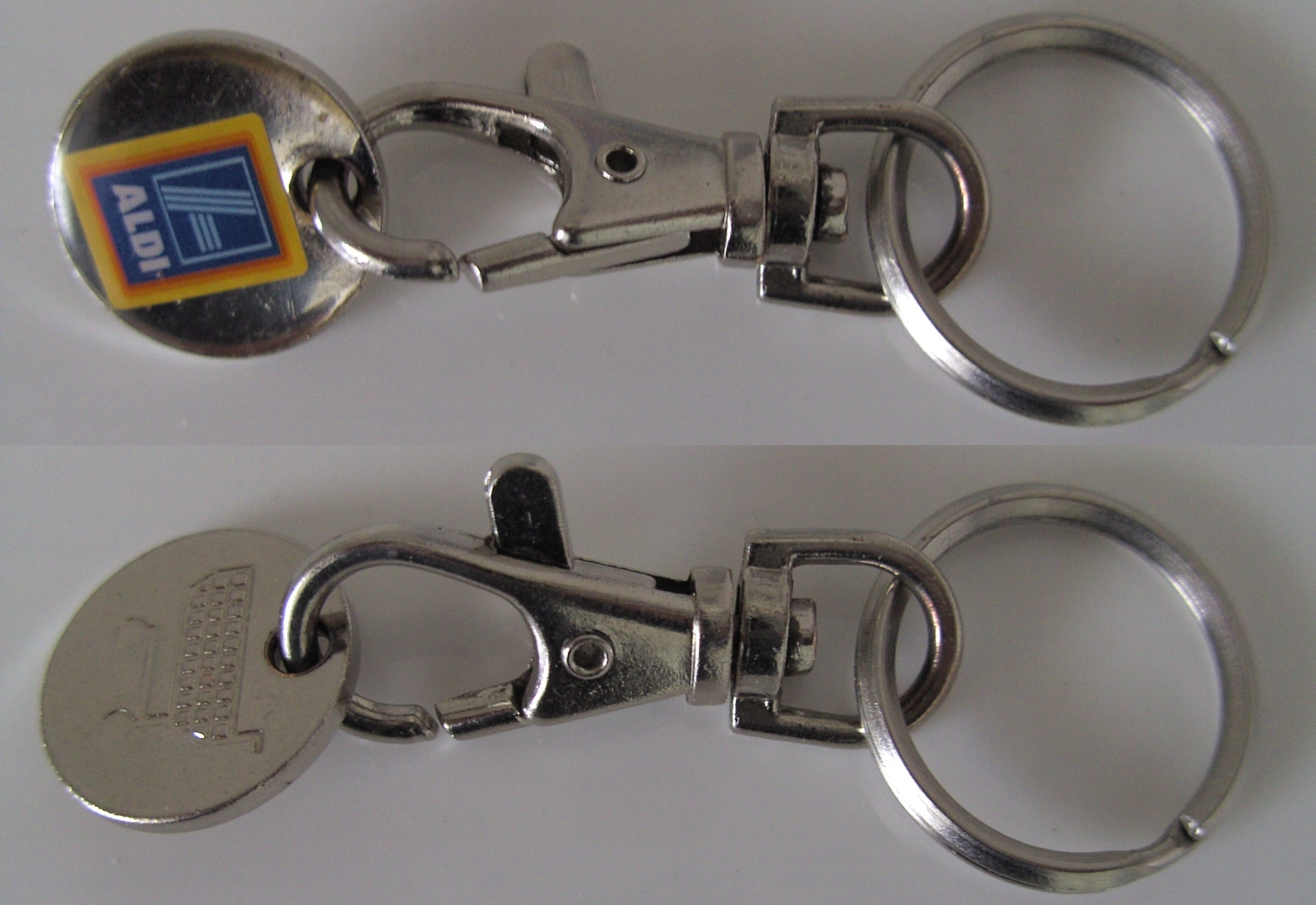
Australian ALDI cart token, sold in-store for A$0.99, and sized the same as a $2 coin which can also be used to unlock a trolley

== See also ==
- American Vecturist Association
- Civil War token
- Gettone
- Glossary of numismatics
- Feuchtwanger Cent
- Hard times token
- Jeton
- Medal game
- Méreau (token)
- National Transport Tokens (UK)
- Pub token
- Sales tax token
- Telephone token
- Token and Medal Society
- Token economy
- Token sucking
