= Stanstead Hall =

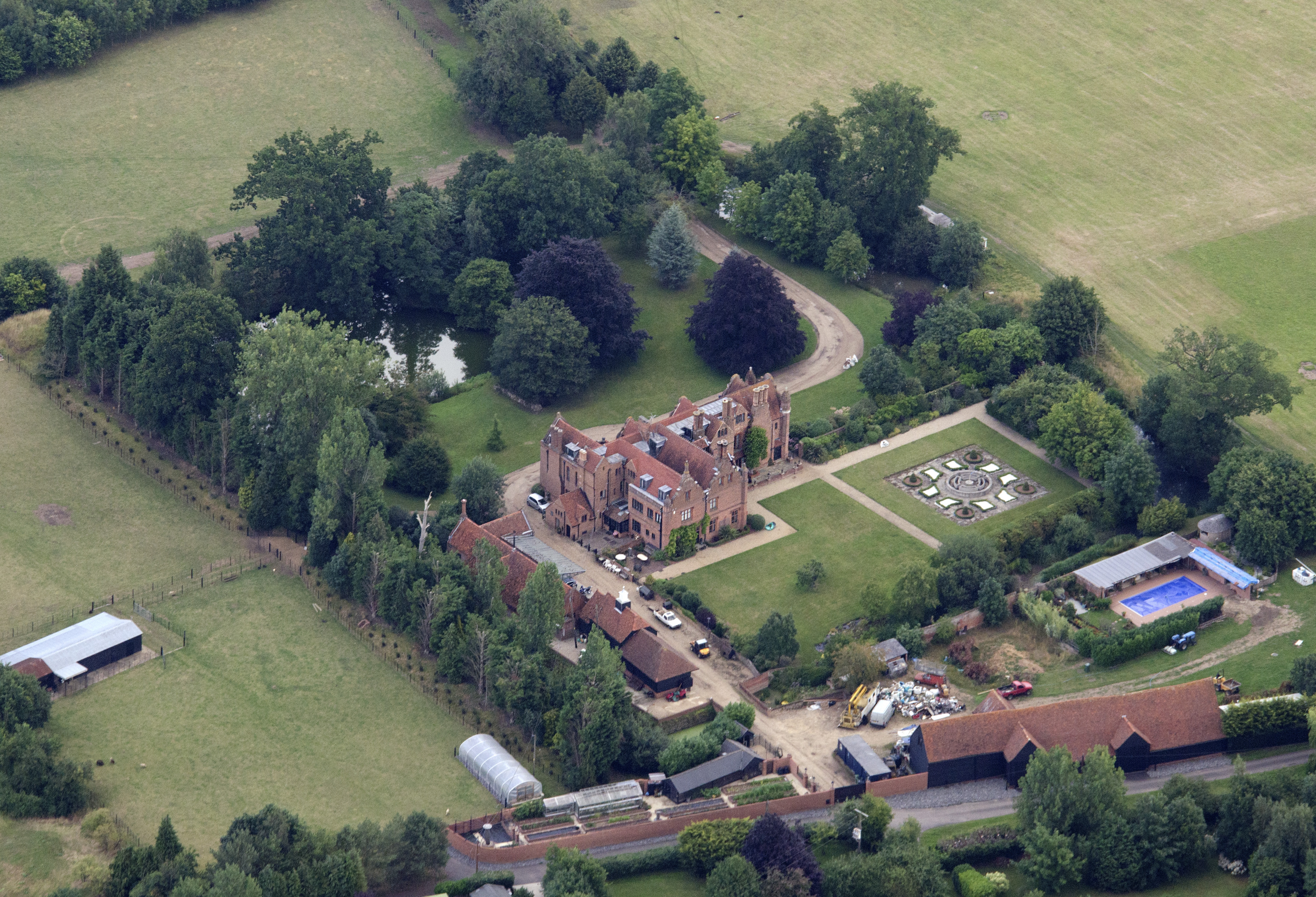
- Aerial view of Stanstead Hall in 2015
- Interactive map of the Stanstead Hall area

General information
- Location: Greenstead Green, Essex, England, United Kingdom

Stanstead Hall is a historic building in Greenstead Green on the outskirts of Halstead, Essex. It has been a Grade II* listed building since 1952. The present building dates to the middle of the 16th century, but an earlier Stanstead Hall can be traced back as far as the 14th century.

== Description ==
The present building largely dates to the middle of the 16th century, with some 20th century extensions. In 1553, Stansted Hall was described as a quadrangular brick building with an enclosed courtyard, surrounded by a moat, with a fortified gateway overlooked by two projecting turrets. It was set in 87 acres of parkland, reaching as far as Halstead. Extensions were built in 1913 and 1934, in a sympathetic style.

== History ==
Stansted Hall was the seat of the de Bourchier family from at least the 14th century, when it was the seat of John de Bourchier and his wife Helen of Colchester. Their son Robert de Bourchier was born at Stansted Hall; he went on to become Lord Chancellor of England in 1340, the first layman to hold the post. He received a licence to crenellate Stansted Hall from Edward III in 1341. On Robert's death to the bubonic plague in 1348, ownership of Stansted Hall was inherited by his son John de Bourchier.

Stansted Hall remained with the Bourchier family until the 1540s, when heiress Anne Bourchier left her husband William Parr; the acrimonious split saw Parr receive the house. Parr later sold Stansted Hall to Sir William Waldegrave. The building was eventually purchased by Samuel Courtauld in 1907, and later passed by marriage to Rab Butler. It remains in private ownership to this day, and in 2022 was listed for sale for £6.5 million.

== Notable Residents ==
- John de Bourchier, Judge of the Common Pleas
- Robert de Bourchier, Lord Chancellor of England
- William Parr, Earl of Essex and brother-in-law of Henry VIII
- Samuel Courtauld, industrialist and art collector
- Rab Butler, de facto Deputy Prime Minister of the United Kingdom
