= Beeleigh Abbey =

Building in Maldon, Essex, England

Coordinates: 51.7379°N 0.6635°E

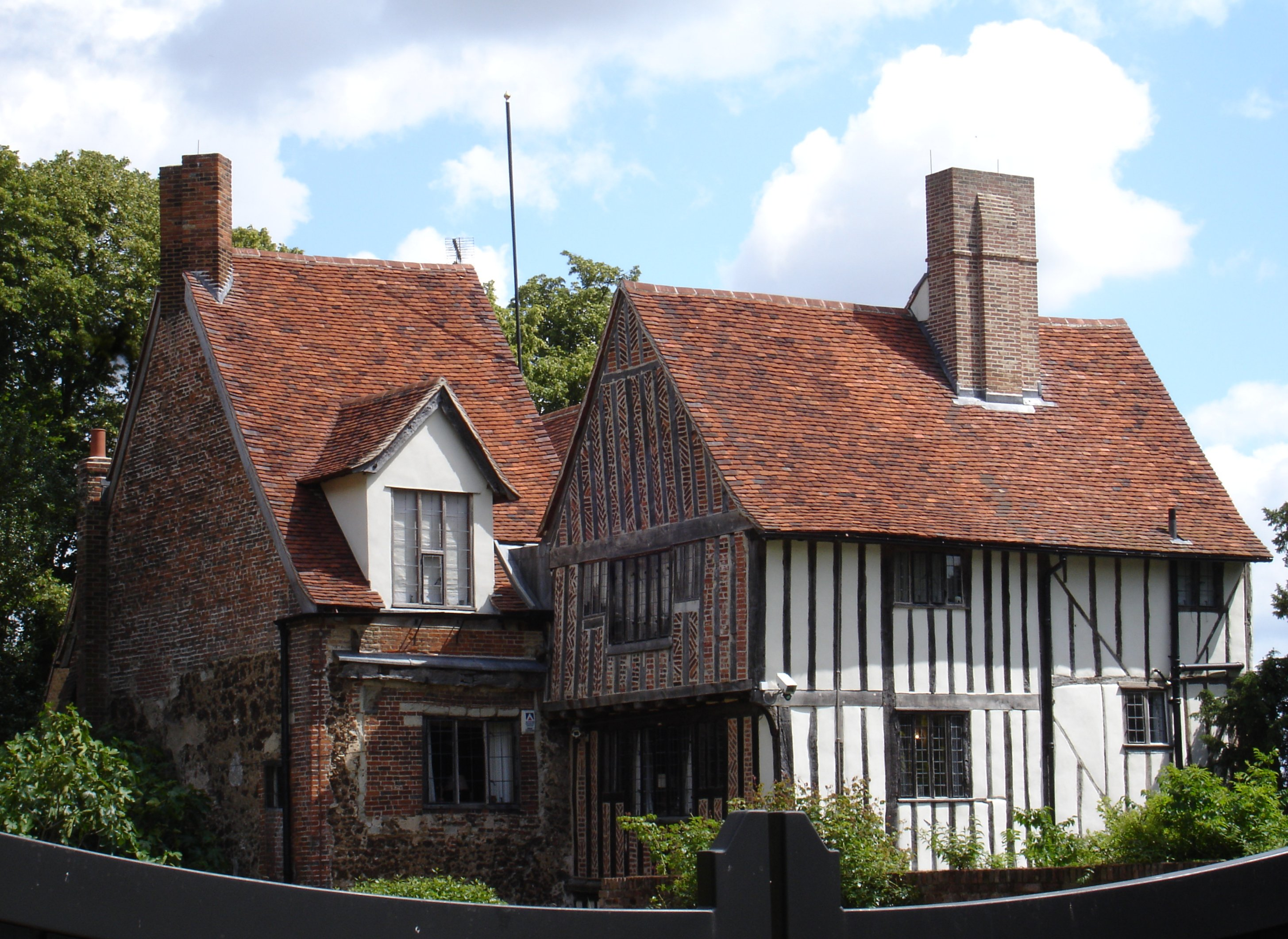
Beeleigh Abbey house, incorporating remains of the earlier monastery on the site

Beeleigh Abbey near Maldon in Essex, England, was a monastery constructed in 1180 for the Premonstratensians, as known as the Norbertines or Premonstratensians. The order linked the change of the separate life of monks in the 12th century with the retrospective life of the friar, who was considerably more active.

== History ==
Beeleigh Abbey was originally a daughter of Newsham Abbey in Lincolnshire, established at the instigation of Robert de Mantell, lord of the manor of Little Maldon. The abbey obtained a royal charter from Richard I in 1189.

The heart of Roger Niger (St Roger of Beeleigh), a 13th-century Bishop of London) was buried at Beeleigh and the abbey became a pilgrimage site. In 1289, pilgrims included King Edward I and Queen Eleanor of Castile.

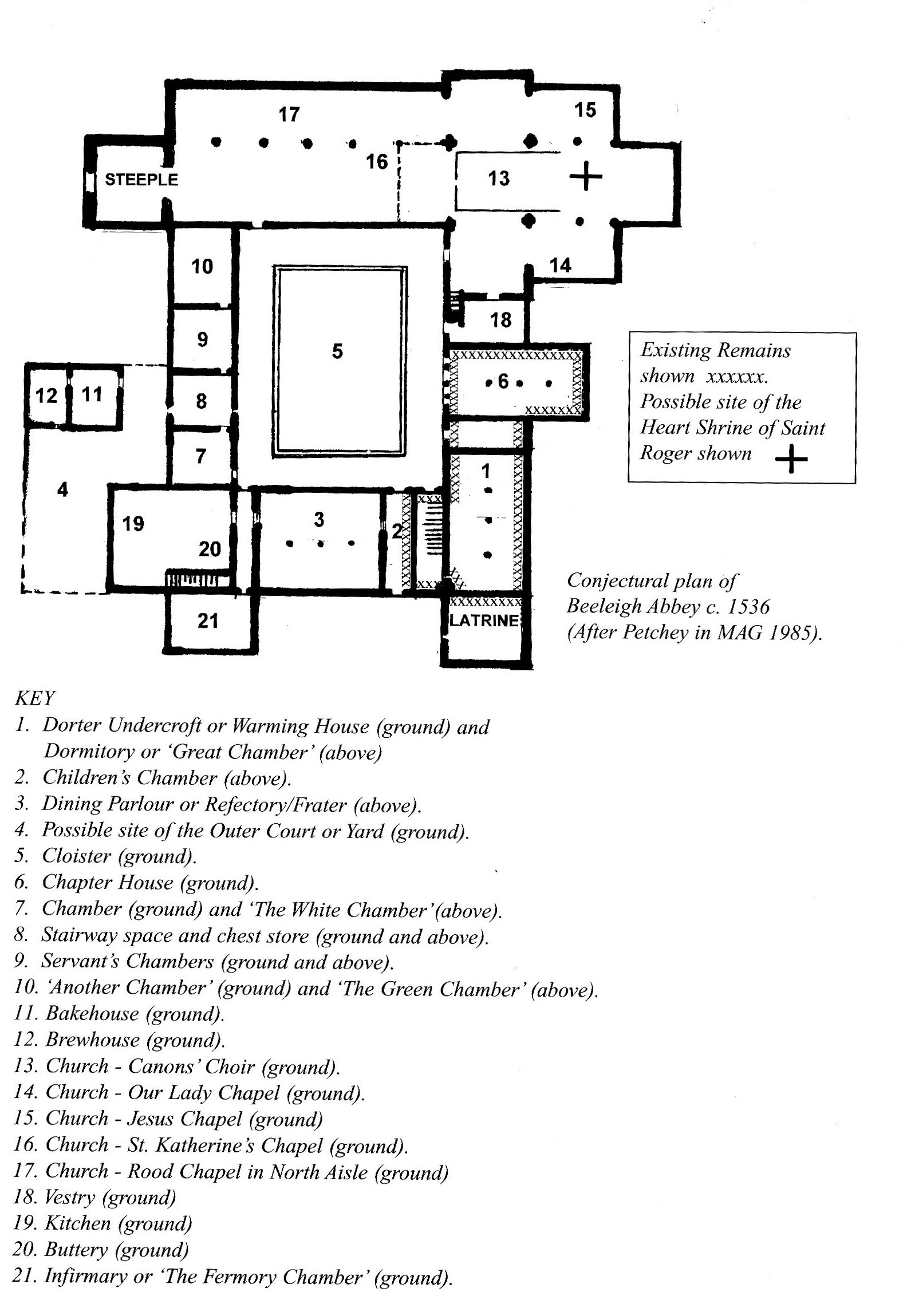
A plan of Beeleigh Abbey as it was in 1536. By permission of Stephen P. Nunn from his book ‘St. Roger of Beeleigh’ 2001 ISBN 0 9511948 4 4

In the year 14 Edward II (8 July 1320 - 7 July 1321), John Ammory retained the manor of Little Maldon, land in Great Maldon, and the advowsons of the abbey of Beeleigh and the hospital of St Giles at Little Maldon, acquired in exchange for the manor of Toseland (Hunts.) from John de Grey, who previously acquired the said manor, land, and advowsons from Thomas Filliol.

After the Dissolution of the Monasteries, many of the abbey buildings were pulled down. In 1540, Henry VIII granted the abbey and lands to Sir John Gate, Chancellor of the Duchy of Lancaster. Thirty years after the land was given away there was an extension added to the abbey of a farmhouse.

During the 18th century, the building was used as a public house. By the late 19th century, the buildings were in a ruinous condition, but in 1912, restoration was begun by Captain F. W. Grantham. In 1943, the Abbey was purchased by William Foyle, co-owner of Foyles bookshop with his brother Gilbert.

The abbey is now a private residence and is not generally open to the public, but small private groups may be shown around it by prior arrangement with the owners. The roofs of the resilient medieval buildings can be seen from a footpath that runs down market hill and ends following the River Chelmer. The abbey gardens, are now also open to the public, on specific days during the summer months.

In 2008, the Premonstratensians returned to Essex, establishing a house at St. Philip's Priory in Chelmsford, some 8 miles from Beeleigh. In 2010 the Prior of St Philip's Priory and three of the canons were welcomed to Beeleigh Abbey, the first such visit by White Canons since the visit in 1955 by Father Norbert Backmund of Windberg Abbey in Bavaria. He was the first White Canon to have visited Beeleigh since the monastic dissolution in 1536.

In April 2011, the Abbot General, worldwide head of the Premonstratensian Order (White Canons) in Rome, Father Thomas Handgraetinger, was welcomed at Beeleigh, together with the Prior of Chelmsford, Father Hugh Allan, and three canons. Father Hugh Allan, Prior of Chelmsford, was promoted to Abbot, and with the agreement of the owners of Beeleigh Abbey, Mr & Mrs Christopher Foyle, became Titular Abbot of Beeleigh, the first Abbot of Beeleigh since 1536. On 8 December 2016 at the Roman Catholic Church of Our Lady Immaculate in Chelmsford Father Hugh was enthroned Abbot by the Bishop of Brentwood in the presence of the Bishop Emeritus, the Anglican Bishop of Chelmsford, the High Sheriff of Essex and other Essex VIPs, many canons and clergy and a full congregation. Christopher Foyle presented the mitre to the Abbot.

In August 2000, following the death in 1999 of the previous incumbent, William Foyle's daughter Christina Foyle, Christopher Foyle, chairman of Foyles Bookshops, and from 1978 until 2006, chairman of the Air Foyle Group, his cargo and passenger airline corporation, and his wife Catherine, purchased Beeleigh Abbey and its 400-acre estate beside the river Chelmer from Christina Foyle's executors. They then set about a four-year restoration of the Abbey and its gardens, which had deteriorated somewhat during the previous 30 years. As a result, in 2008, they were awarded, by the Royal Institution of Chartered Surveyors, their East of England Conservation Award, and later in the same year, their National Conservation Award, for the best restored historical building in the UK.

== Archaeology ==
In 2000, the owners arranged for an archaeological investigation of the site that continued until 2006. A geophysical survey was followed by an excavation. During the course of the investigation there were a number of "open days" which allowed hundreds of visitors to see the site. Nothing could be dated to the 1180 construction, but among the discoveries were the foundations of a medieval hall house, a brick clamp, and other outbuildings.

Other finds included large amounts of pottery dated from the 12th to the 16th century, a small amount of early (13th - 16th century) coins, some jetons and a seal matrix that belonged to the Abbey. Further excavations are being planned.

== Burials at the Abbey ==
- Isabel of Cambridge, Countess of Essex
- Henry Bourchier, 1st Earl of Essex
- John Bourchier, 6th Baron Ferrers of Groby
