= Robert Bourchier, 1st Baron Bourchier =

Lord chancellor of England (died 1349)

Canting arms of Bourchier: Argent, a cross engrailed gules between four water bougets sable

Robert Bourchier (or Boussier), 1st Baron Bourchier (d. August 20, 1348) was Lord Chancellor of England from 1340 to 1341, the first layman to hold the post.

== Family ==
Robert Bourchier was the eldest son of John de Bourchier (d.circa 1330) (alias Boucher, etc.), a Judge of the Common Pleas, by his wife Helen of Colchester, daughter and heir of Walter of Colchester of Stanstead Hall, in Halstead, Essex. The Bourchier family seat became the estate of Stanstead (not to be confused with nearby Stansted Mountfitchet) in the parish of Halstead, Essex, in which county the family later acquired several estates.

== Life ==
Robert initially followed his father in working for the de Vere family, Earls of Oxford, but later worked for the crown. He served on a diplomatic mission to France in 1327 and was returned as a member of parliament for the county of Essex in 1328–9, 1330 (twice), 1332 (once), and 1339 (both). He held a number of judicial positions, despite no evidence for legal training (although likely), and in 1334 he was chief justice of the king's bench in Ireland, but never took up office. His military career was more active, joining the invasion of Scotland in 1335, was stated to have been present at the Battle of Cadsand in 1337 (although this is regarded by some as a translation error by his descendant John Bouchier) and travelled with Earl of Northampton on Edward III's expedition to Flanders in 1338. On 3 June 1341 he received, in the name of Robertus Bourghchier, Stanstede, a royal licence to crenellate his house at Stanstead in the parish of Halstead in Essex.

On his return to England, the king Edward III committed the great seal, which had been alternating between Archbishop John de Stratford and his brother Robert de Stratford, the Bishop of Chichester, to Bourchier, who thus became, on 14 December 1340, the first lay chancellor. His salary was fixed at £100, besides the usual fees. In the struggle between the king and the archbishop, Bourchier withheld the writ of summons to the ex-chancellor, interrupted his address to the bishops in the Painted Chamber, and on 27 April 1341 urged him to submit to the king. When the parliament of 1341 extorted from the king his assent to their petitions that the account of the royal officers should be audited, and that the chancellor and other great officers should be nominated in parliament, and should swear to obey the laws, Bourchier declared that he had not assented to these articles, and would not be bound by them, as they were contrary to his oath and to the laws of the realm. He nevertheless exemplified the statute, and delivered it to parliament. He resigned his office on 29 October 1341. Robert continued to serve in the King's Council, as a diplomat and as a soldier. In 1342, he commanded a contingent in Brittany, and is recorded as being at the Battle of Crécy in 1346.

He was summoned to parliament as a peer in November 1348 and from then was known as Lord Bourchier (or Burgchier). He died the following year, of the Black Death in Bordeaux, while on a diplomatic mission to Castile with Joan of England, who died shortly after him. He was later buried at Halstead, where he had intended to found a college of eight chaplains.

== Marriage and issue ==
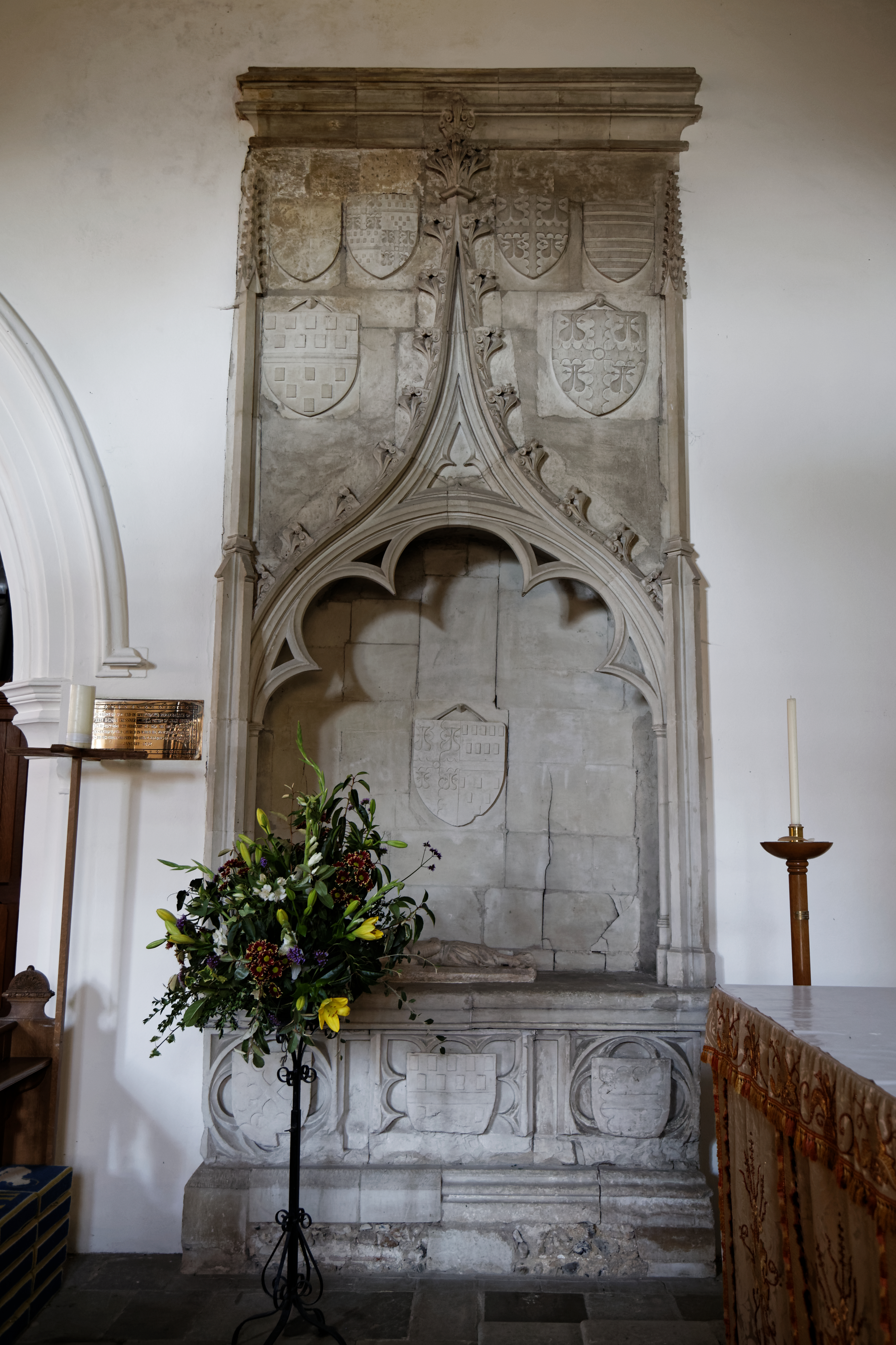
Monument in Little Easton Church, Essex, showing on the main central shield the arms of Bourchier impaling Louvain, signifying the marriage of William Bourchier (d.1375) and Eleanor de Louvaine. The Louvain arms are shown above quartered by Bourchier, being the arms of progeny of that marriage

At some time before 1329 he married Margaret Prayers, daughter and heiress of Sir Thomas Prayers of Sible Hedingham and his wife Anne of Essex, daughter of Hugh of Essex. They had two known children:

- John Bourchier, 2nd Baron Bourchier (1329–1400), eldest son and heir.
- William Bourchier (d. 1375), who married Eleanor de Louvaine (d. 1397), daughter and heiress of Sir John de Louvaine (alias Lovayne, etc.) feudal baron of Little Easton in Essex. Their son was William Bourchier, 1st Count of Eu (1386–1420). The eldest grandson of William Bourchier (d. 1375) was Henry Bourchier, 1st Earl of Essex (1404–1483) who inherited the Barony of Bourchier from the senior line of the family, being the heir of his cousin Elizabeth Bourchier (d. 1433), suo jure 4th Baroness Bourchier.

Peerage of England
New creation	Baron Bourchier; 1342–1349	Succeeded by John Bourchier
