= American Vecturist Association =

The official seal of the American Vecturist Association

The American Vecturist Association (or AVA) is an organization of transportation token collectors in the United States and Canada, as well as worldwide. Members of the AVA receive the Fare Box, the monthly newsletter of the AVA. The Fare Box contains advertisements, stories, and information about various tokens, as well as resources to buy, sell, and trade tokens. AVA members are also eligible to join the New Issue Service, which mails new transportation tokens to its members for a nominal fee.

== History ==
In 1920, Mr. F.C. Kenworthy began cataloging his transportation token collection. Five years later, Mr. Kenworthy handed his work off to Mr. R.W. Dunn. In 1932 Mr. Dunn printed his list of U.S. and foreign transportation tokens. Shortly after printing, Dr. Dunn passed the task of cataloging transportation tokens off to Ronald C. Atwood. In 1948, Mr. Atwood had his National Check and Premium List of All U.S. Transportation Tokens published by the American Numismatic Company of Los Angeles.

Meanwhile, Mr. R.L. Moore began publishing the Fare Box, a monthly newsletter about transportation tokens. On October 31, 1948, the American Vecturist Association was formed in New York City out of interest sparked from Mr. Moore's newsletter. Two months later, Mr. Moore turned over the Fare Box to the newly formed American Vecturist Association. John M. Coffee Jr. (died 2012), a history professor at Emerson College in Boston and Unitarian minister, was the Editor of the Fare Box for 60 years.

== Convention ==
The AVA holds its annual convention in a different U.S. city every August.

The 2022 convention was held August 4–7, 2022 at the Hilton Garden Inn in Ames, IA. The 2023 convention was held in Cheyenne, WY., August 3–6, 2023. At the convention, members are able to buy, sell and trade tokens as well as attend the auction and banquet. Plans are being made to hold the 2024 Convention in New Orleans, LA.

== Publications ==
The AVA publishes a number of books, all of which are available at discount prices to AVA members:

- Volume I – The Atwood-Coffee Catalogue of United States and Canadian Transportation Tokens, The Listing: (2007; 940 pages, hardbound or loose-leaf): 6th Edition. Complete listing of all known U.S. and Canadian transportation tokens, with collector values.
- Volume II – The Atwood-Coffee Catalogue of United States and Canadian Transportation Tokens: History and Encyclopedia of Transportation Tokens: (1984; 776 pages, hardbound): 4th Edition. Compendium of stories and articles about transportation tokens with thousands of photos, quantities struck, dates of usage, rates of fare, etc.
- Volume III – The Atwood-Coffee Catalogue of United States and Canadian Transportation Tokens: The Die Variety Encyclopedia (1986; 946 pages, hardbound): Lists minor die varieties of U.S. and Canadian transportation tokens, with thousands of enlarged, high quality photos.
- Car Wash tokens of North America, 2nd edition (2001; 330 pages)
- Land Company and Real Estate Tokens (110 pages, hardbound)

== Officers ==
- President: Chris Donovan
- Vice-president: Fred Sader
- Corresponding Secretary: Randy Glucksman
- Recording Secretary: Leonard Gresens
- Treasurer: Joel J. Reznick
- Curator: Keith M. Haney
- Fare Box Editor: Bob Schneider
- Past President: Rich Mallicote
- New Token Chairman: Joel Bernstein
- Convention Chairman: Rich Malicote

== See also ==
- Token coin
- Numismatics
- Exonumia
- Category:Collecting
