= Joan of England (died 1348) =

14th-century English princess

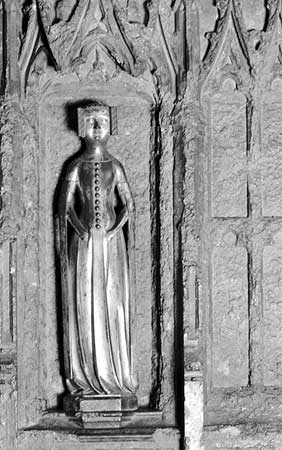
- Born: 19 December 1333 or 28 January 1334; Tower of London (perhaps)
- Died: 2 September 1348 (aged 14)
- Burial: Bayonne Cathedral
- House: Plantagenet
- Father: Edward III of England
- Mother: Philippa of Hainault

Joan of England (19 December 1333 or 28 January 1334 – 2 September 1348) was a daughter of Edward III and his wife, Philippa of Hainault. She died in the Black Death that struck Europe in 1348.

== Life ==
Joan, also known as Joanna, was born in the Tower of London. As a child she was placed in the care of Marie de St Pol, wife of Aymer de Valence and foundress of Pembroke College, Cambridge. She grew up with her sister Isabella, her brother Edward, and their cousin Joan of Kent.

In 1336, Joan was betrothed to the eldest son of Otto, Duke of Austria, with the stipulation that she would receive her education at the Austrian court. However, Edward III showed reluctance in sending her and delayed her departure, promising that he would personally accompany her the following year.

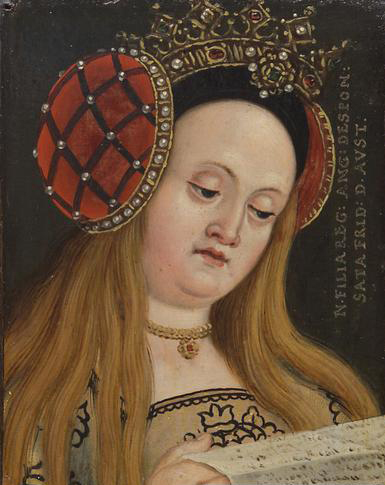
Fanciful 16th-century depiction of Joan by Anton Boys

In 1338, Joan accompanied her father on his campaign to Antwerp. Later, they traveled to Koblenz, where they met Louis IV, Holy Roman Emperor, and were his special guests at the Imperial Diet in the church of Saint Castor. Edward III was crowned vicar-general of the Holy Roman Empire and formed an alliance with Louis against Philip VI of France, but in 1341 the emperor deserted him.

Joan travelled with Louis IV's consort, Margaret of Hainault, to Munich and remained at court there for nearly a year before finally being brought to the Austrian court in the autumn of 1339. Around this time, Duke Otto died, and Edward sensed that the new Duke of Austria was swayed towards France. As a result, he decided to dissolve the marriage agreement and insisted on Joan's return home in 1340.

In 1345, she was betrothed to Peter of Castile, son of Maria of Portugal and Alfonso XI of Castile. In the summer of 1348, she left England with the blessing of her parents. Thanks to a heavily armed retinue she was, perhaps, the most protected woman of Europe at the time, and it is said that her trousseau alone required an entire ship. The travel schedule included a visit to one of her family's castles in Bordeaux.

== Death ==
As Joan embarked on her journey, the Black Death had not yet appeared in England, and it is unlikely that the party was aware of the danger. Despite the severe outbreak of plague in Bordeaux, at first it did not occur to Joan and her advisors to leave town. Soon, they watched in horror as the members of the entourage began falling sick and dying. Robert Bouchier, the leader of the retinue, died on 20 August.

Joan feared for her life and was probably moved to the small village of Lormont (Loremo), where she remained for some time. However, she could not escape the disease and became its first victim in the camp, suffering a violent, quick attack and dying on 2 September 1348.

Some accounts document that Joan was buried in Bordeaux Cathedral, and her statue, in Westminster Abbey, is on the South Side of her father's tomb.

== Letter to Alfonso ==
Here is an excerpt from the letter that King Edward III sent to King Alfonso of Castile (translated by Rosemary Horrox in her book The Black Death):

We are sure that your Magnificence knows how, after much complicated negotiation about the intended marriage of the renowned Prince Pedro, your eldest son, and our most beloved daughter Joan, which was designed to nurture perpetual peace and create an indissoluble union between our Royal Houses, we sent our said daughter to Bordeaux, en route for your territories in Spain. But see, with what intense bitterness of heart we have to tell you this, destructive Death (who seizes young and old alike, sparing no one and reducing rich and poor to the same level) has lamentably snatched from both of us our dearest daughter, whom we loved best of all, as her virtues demanded

No fellow human being could be surprised if we were inwardly desolated by the sting of this bitter grief, for we are humans too. But we, who have placed our trust in God and our Life between his hands, where he has held it closely through many great dangers, we give thanks to him that one of our own family, free of all stain, whom we have loved with our life, has been sent ahead to Heaven to reign among the choirs of virgins, where she can gladly intercede for our offenses before God Himself.

== Sources ==
- Green, Mary Anne Everett (1857). Lives of the Princesses of England Vol. III. London. pp. 229–260.
- Mortimer, Ian (2006). The Perfect King: The Life of Edward III, Father of the English Nation. London: Jonathan Cape. ISBN 0-2240-7301-X.
- Ormrod, W. M. (1990). The reign of Edward III : crown and political Society in England, 1327-1377.
