= John de Bourchier =

English judge

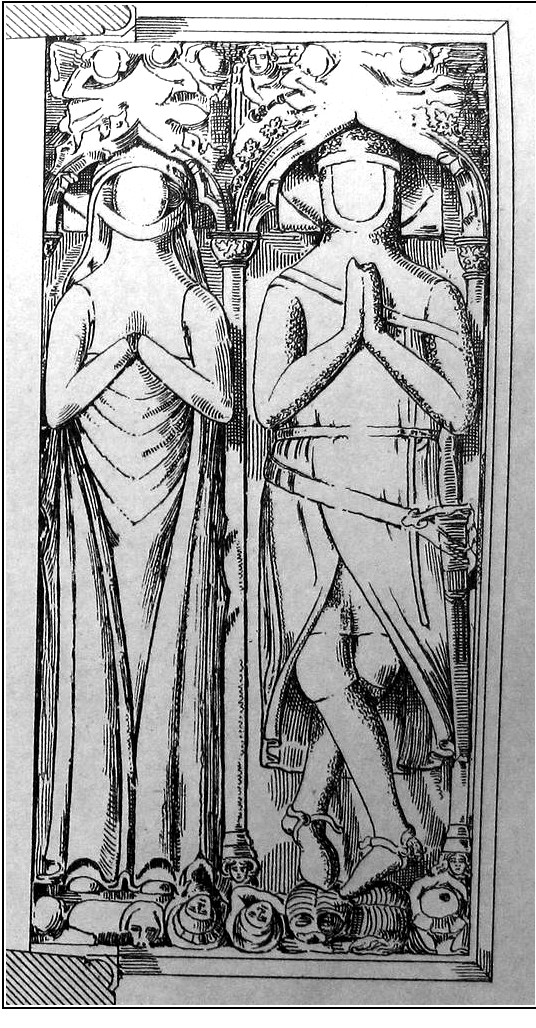
Drawing circa 1890 of granite double effigy in St Andrew's Church, Halstead, believed to represent John de Bourchier (d. circa 1329) of Stanstead Hall, Halstead and his wife Helen of Colchester

Canting arms of Bourchier: Argent, a cross engrailed gules between four water bougets sable

John de Bourchier (alias Boussier, etc., d. c. 1329) was an English Judge of the Common Pleas and the earliest ancestor, about whose life substantial details are known, of the noble and prolific Bourchier family, which in its various branches later held the titles Barons Bourchier, Counts of Eu, Viscounts Bourchier, Earls of Essex, Barons Berners, Barons FitzWarin and Earls of Bath.

== Origins ==
There is no evidence which confirms this family to have originated in France, and it was possibly of ancient English origin. Its name was however Latinised by scribes to de Burgo Caro, "from the costly town", from a Gallicisation of the name to le Bourg Cher.

== Early career ==
Bouchier is first mentioned as deputed by Robert de Vere, 6th Earl of Oxford (1257–1331) to represent him in the parliament summoned in 1306 for the purpose of granting an aid on the occasion of the Prince of Wales (the future King Edward II (1307–1327)) receiving knighthood. In 1312 he was permitted to postpone for three years the assumption of his own knighthood, an expensive and burdensome honour, on paying a fine of 100 shillings.

In 1314–1315 his name is recorded as one of the Justices of Assize for the counties of Kent, Surrey, and Sussex, and also on various commissions for the years 1317, 1319, and 1320. On 15 May 1321 he was summoned as a justice to parliament at Westminster, apparently for the first time, and on 31 May 1321 he was appointed a Justice of the Common Pleas.

== Judicial career ==
In 1322 Bouchier presided over the trial of certain persons charged with making forcible entry upon the manors of Hugh le Despenser (c.1286–1326), Lord of Glamorgan, in Glamorganshire, Brecknock, and elsewhere, and in investigating a charge of malversation against certain commissioners of forfeited estates in Kent, Surrey, and Sussex, and trying cases of extortion by sheriffs, commissioners of array, and other officers in Essex, Hertford, and Middlesex. In the same year of 1322 he sat on a special commission for the trial of persons accused of complicity in the fabrication of miracles in the neighbourhood of the gallows on which Henry de Montfort and Henry de Wylyngton had been hanged at Bristol.

In February 1326 Bouchier was placed at the head of a commission to try a charge of poaching brought by the Bishop of London and the dean and chapter of St Paul's against a number of persons alleged to have taken a large fish, qui dicitur cete,("which is called a tuna") from the manor of Walton, in violation of a charter of King Henry III. The chapter claimed the exclusive right to all large fish found on their estates, the tongue only being reserved to the king.

In the same year of 1326 he was engaged in trying cases of extortion by legal officials in Suffolk, Nottinghamshire, and Derbyshire, and persons indicted before the conservators of the peace in Lincolnshire. In December of this year Bourchier was summoned to parliament for the last time. He was reappointed Justice of the Common Pleas shortly after the accession of King Edward III (1327–1377), the patent being dated 24 March 1327. The last fine was levied before him on Ascension Day 1329.

== Marriage and progeny ==
He married Helen of Colchester, daughter and heir of Walter of Colchester, by which means he inherited the estate of Stanstead, (not to be confused with the nearby parish and village of Stansted Mountfitchet) in the parish of Halstead, Essex, which adjoined an estate which he had purchased in 1312. He made his seat here at Stanstead Hall, of which in 1848 only one wing was reported as surviving, then used as a farm house, situated 1 mile S.S.E. of the town of Halstead. It is shown on the Ordnance Survey map as "Stanstead Hall Moated Site", with remains of an ancient chapel, adjacent to the surviving large 16th-century mansion called "Stanstead Hall", in the modern parish of Greenstead Green and Halstead Rural, lately the residence of the statesman Lord Butler of Saffron Walden (died 1982). His progeny included:

- Robert Bourchier, 1st Baron Bourchier (died 1349), Lord Chancellor

== Death and burial ==
He died shortly after Ascension Day 1329 as is deduced from the fact that in the following year his son and heir, Robert Bourchier, was put in possession of his estates by the king. According to Rigg (1900) he was buried in Stanstead Church, yet it is more commonly held that his burial was in St Andrew's Church, Halstead, where a pair of granite recumbent effigies are believed to represent himself and his wife.

== Sources ==
- Rigg, James McMullen, biography of Sir John de Bourchier published in Dictionary of National Biography, 1885–1900, Vol.6 (Text in public domain)
