= Isabel of Cambridge, Countess of Essex =

English noblewoman (1409–1484)

Isabel of Cambridge
- Countess of Essex
- Born: 1409
- Died: 2 October 1484 (aged 74–75)
- Burial: Beeleigh Abbey, Little Easton, Essex
- Spouses: Sir Thomas Grey (m. 1413; died 1426) Henry Bourchier, 1st Earl of Essex (m. 1426; died 1483)
- Issue: Thomas Grey; William Bourchier, Viscount Bourchier; Sir Henry Bourchier; Humphrey Bourchier, 1st Baron Cromwell; John Bourchier; Sir Thomas Bourchier; Edward Bourchier; Fulk Bourchier; Isabel Bourchier
- House: York
- Father: Richard of Conisburgh, 3rd Earl of Cambridge
- Mother: Anne Mortimer

Isabel of Cambridge, Countess of Essex (1409 – 2 October 1484) was the only daughter of Richard, 3rd Earl of Cambridge, and Anne de Mortimer. She was the sister of Richard of York, 3rd Duke of York, and a great-granddaughter of Edward III of England.

== Early life ==
Isabel of York, the only daughter of Richard of Conisburgh, 3rd Earl of Cambridge, and Anne de Mortimer, was born about 1409. Through her father, she was the granddaughter of King Edward III's fourth surviving son, Edmund of Langley, 1st Duke of York, and his first wife, Isabella of Castile. Through her mother, Anne de Mortimer, Isabel was the granddaughter of Roger Mortimer, 4th Earl of March, and Lady Alianore Holland (granddaughter of Lady Joan of Kent, Princess of Wales) and the great-great-granddaughter of Edward III's second surviving son, Lionel of Antwerp.

Isabel's father, Richard, Earl of Cambridge, was beheaded on 5 August 1415 for his part in the Southampton Plot against King Henry V. Although the Earl's title was forfeited, he was not attainted, (Note: Cokayne states that he was attainted.) and Isabel's brother, Richard, then aged four, was his father's heir. Within a few months of his father's death, Richard's childless uncle, Edward of Norwich, 2nd Duke of York, was slain at the Battle of Agincourt on 25 October 1415, and Isabel's brother was eventually his uncle's heir as well.

== Marriages and issue ==
In 1412, at three years of age, Isabel was betrothed to Sir Thomas Grey (1404 – d. before 1426), (Note: Some sources assert that this Thomas Grey died not on 1426, but, rather, sometime before 26 July 1443. The marriage is instead said to have been annulled in 1426.) son and heir of Sir Thomas Grey (c. 1385 – 1415) of Heaton in Norham, Northumberland, and his wife, Alice Neville, the daughter of Ralph Neville, 1st Earl of Westmorland. The marriage took place on 18 February 1413. They had one son, also called Thomas Grey (1423–1493). The elder Sir Thomas Grey was an associate of Isabel's father who also lost his life in the Southampton Plot.

She married, secondly, Henry Bourchier, 1st Earl of Essex, before 25 April 1426. Their marriage lasted for 57 years until Essex's death in 1483. The marriage was later validated by papal dispensation. By Essex, she had at least eleven children:

- William Bourchier, Viscount Bourchier (d. 1480), who married Anne Woodville, daughter of Richard Woodville, 1st Earl Rivers and Jacquetta of Luxembourg, parents of Henry Bourchier, 2nd Earl of Essex, and Cecily Bourchier, wife of John Devereux, 9th Baron Ferrers of Chartley;
- Sir Henry Bourchier (d. 1462), who married Elizabeth Scales, 8th Baroness Scales.
- Humphrey Bourchier, 1st Baron Cromwell (d. 14 April 1471), slain at the Battle of Barnet.
- John Bourchier, 6th Baron Ferrers of Groby (d. 1495), who married, firstly, Elizabeth Ferrers, and, secondly, Elizabeth Chichelle.
- Edward Bourchier (d. 30 December 1460). Killed in the Battle of Wakefield.
- Sir Thomas Bourchier (b. prior to 1448 – 1492), who married Isabella Barre. No known children.
- Florence Bourchier (d. 1525).
- Fulk Bourchier, considered to have died young.
- Hugh Bourchier, considered to have died young.
- Isabella Bourchier, considered to have died young.

== Death ==
Henry Bourchier, 1st Earl of Essex, died on 4 April 1483. Isabel remained a widow and died on 2 October 1484. A manuscript calendar records her death on VI Non Oct in 1484. Both were buried at Beeleigh Abbey near Maldon, Essex, but later reburied at Little Easton, Essex.

== Ancestry ==
Ancestors of Isabel of Cambridge, Countess of Essex

16. Edward II of England
8. Edward III of England
17. Isabella of France
4. Edmund of Langley, 1st Duke of York
18. William I, Count of Hainaut
9. Philippa of Hainault
19. Joan of Valois
2. Richard of Conisburgh, 3rd Earl of Cambridge
20. Alfonso XI of Castile
10. Peter of Castile
21. Maria of Portugal
5. Isabella of Castile, Duchess of York
22. Juan García de Padilla, 1st Señor de Villagera
11. María de Padilla
23. María Fernández de Henestrosa
1. Isabel of Cambridge, Countess of Essex
24. Roger Mortimer, 2nd Earl of March
12. Edmund Mortimer, 3rd Earl of March
25. Lady Philippa Montacute
6. Roger Mortimer, 4th Earl of March
26. Lionel of Antwerp, 1st Duke of Clarence
13. Philippa, 5th Countess of Ulster
27. Elizabeth de Burgh, 4th Countess of Ulster
3. Lady Anne de Mortimer
28. Thomas Holland, 1st Earl of Kent
14. Thomas Holland, 2nd Earl of Kent
29. Lady Joan, 4th Countess of Kent
7. Lady Alianore Holland
30. Richard FitzAlan, 10th Earl of Arundel
15. Lady Alice Fitzalan
31. Eleanor of Lancaster

== Bibliography ==
- Cokayne, George Edward (1932). The Complete Peerage, edited by H.A. Doubleday. Vol. VIII. London: St. Catherine Press. pp. 445–53.
- Harriss, G.L. (2004). "Richard, earl of Cambridge (1385–1415)". Oxford Dictionary of National Biography (online ed.). Oxford University Press. doi:10.1093/ref:odnb/23502. (Subscription, Wikipedia Library access or UK public library membership required.) (subscription required)
- Pugh, T.B. (1988). Henry V and the Southampton Plot of 1415. Alan Sutton. ISBN 0-86299-541-8.
- Richardson, Douglas (2011). Everingham, Kimball G. (ed.). Magna Carta Ancestry: A Study in Colonial and Medieval Families. Vol. III (2nd ed.). Salt Lake City. ISBN 978-1449966393.
- Richardson, Douglas (2011). Everingham, Kimball G. (ed.). Magna Carta Ancestry: A Study in Colonial and Medieval Families. Vol. IV (2nd ed.). Salt Lake City. ISBN 978-1460992708.
