= Bartholomew Bourchier, 3rd Baron Bourchier =

Canting arms of Bourchier: Argent, a cross engrailed gules between four water bougets sable

Bartholomew Bourchier, 3rd Baron Bourchier (died 18 May 1409) was an English baron.

== Family ==
Bartholomew was the only known child of John Bourchier, 2nd Baron Bourchier, and his wife Maud Coggeshall. He inherited the title in 1400.

== Life ==
He was summoned to Parliament as a member of the House of Lords the first time 9 September 1400, the year of his father's death. He continued to be summoned until 1409, but obtained an exemption from attended in 1405. There are no records of military service, unlike his father and grandfather. He died on 18 May 1409 and was buried on family estates, in Halstead, Essex.

== Marriage and issue ==
He married twice. Firstly to Margaret, the widow of Sir John Sutton but had no issue. Following her death, he married Idoine Lovet (d. 12 September 1410), widow of John Glevant, by whom he had one child and sole heiress:

- Elizabeth Bourchier, 4th Baroness Bourchier (c. 1399 – 1433), whose heir was her second cousin Henry Bourchier, 1st Earl of Essex (1404–1483), KG, created Viscount Bourchier in 1446 and Earl of Essex in 1461.
