= Telephone token =

Token coins for telephone calls

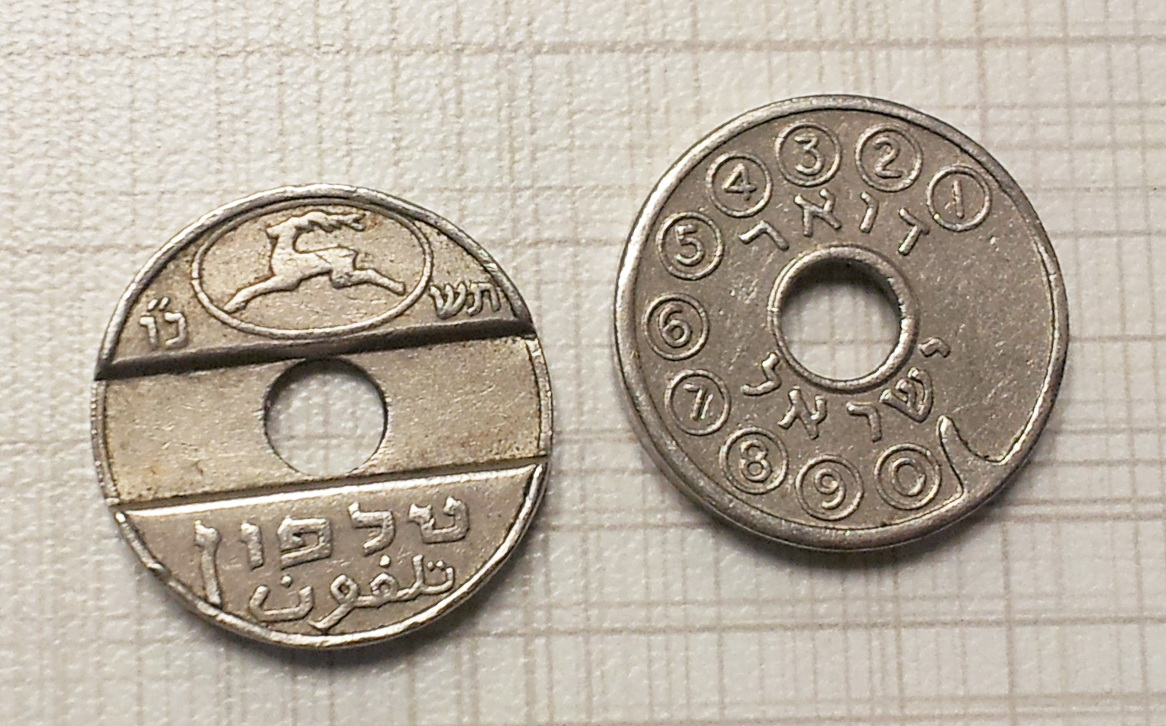
An Israeli telephone token, or asimon, used until the early 1990s

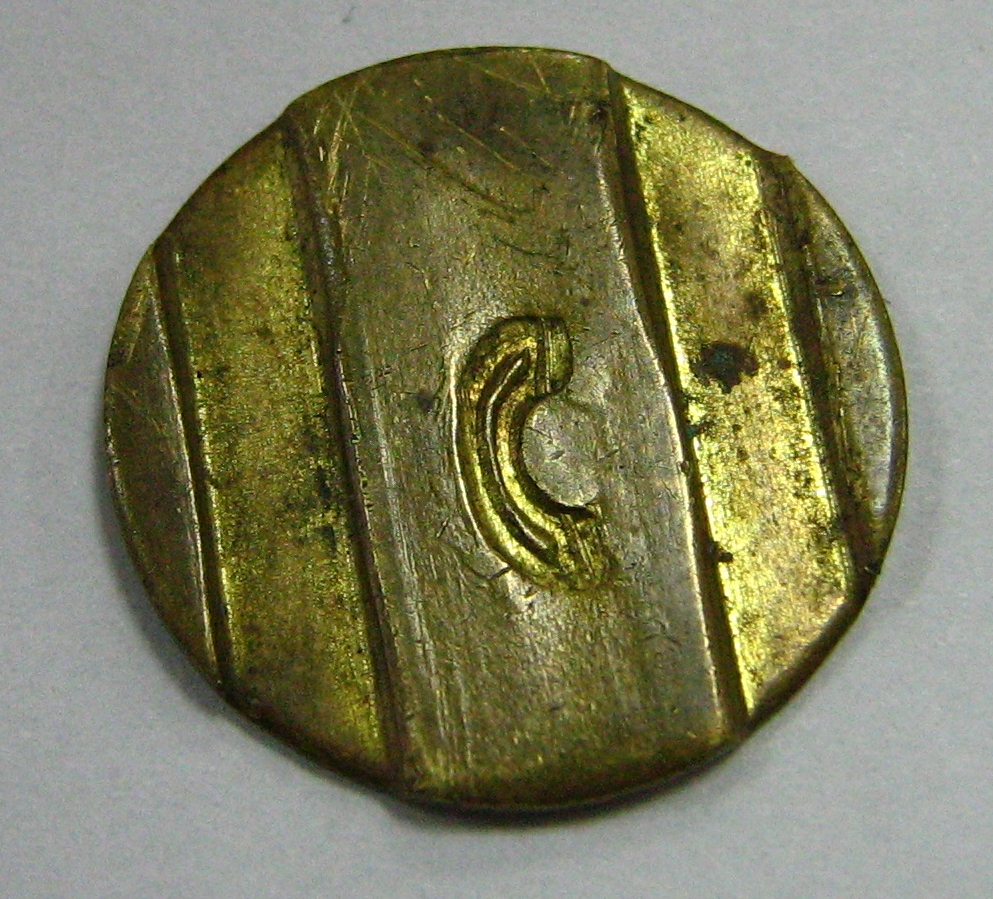
Telephone token used in Kazakhstan

Telephone tokens were token coins once widely used for making telephone calls from public telephones in place of ordinary coins. They were also sometimes used as a medium of exchange and as a collectible. Telephone tokens were once widely used in Europe, Israel, Japan, and South America, but have since been largely superseded by telephone cards and credit cards.

They were introduced during inflationary periods to avoid having to frequently change the coin slots on pay phones.

== History ==
Phone tokens started in Chicago, in the United States, where public phones would accept only tokens. Tokens were used in the U.S. until 1944, when they were eliminated and most of the tokens were melted down to make shell casings. The earliest-known telephone token dates from 1885, when it was produced for the PAN Telephone Company in St. Louis, Missouri. Rather than being deposited in the phone, the token was sometimes given to an attendant or placed in a coin box to gain access to the phone booth.

The practice of using tokens and allowing their specific value to float with the going rate for a phone call eventually became the standard world-wide practice. This came in especially handy in European countries where currencies changed as one crossed national borders, but a token could still be used. It was also the practice for some restaurants to have their own tokens so that those bought at a different place could not be used at that business.

In some countries, such as with Italian gettone, they were used informally as cash equivalents.

Most telephone tokens are round and many have grooves.

== See also ==
- Gettone telefonico
- Jeton
- Telephone card
