= John Bourchier (bishop-designate) =

John Bourchier (1493 – c. 1577) was bishop-designate of Gloucester, England.
