= Louis Robessart =

Louis (de) Robessart KG (c.1390 – 27 November 1430), also known as Lewis Robessart or Robesart or Robersart or Robsart, was a knight in the service of King Henry V of England. He fought at the Battle of Agincourt in 1415. He acquired the title of Baron Bourchier by right of his wife Elizabeth Bourchier, 4th Baroness Bourchier, and died in battle against the French during the Hundred Years' War.

Lewis and his elder brother Jean were the grandsons of Sir Thierry de Robessart, seigneur de d’Escaillon, whose family originated from Hainault, where Lewis was born. Thierry was engaged in the service of King Edward III of England, and later married a cousin of Constance of Castile; he is mentioned in the chronicles of Jean Froissart. He passed on the tradition of service to the English royal family to his son Jean (Lewis's father), who served both Richard II and Henry IV.

By 1403 Lewis was fighting in Wales in the retinue of King Henry V, then Prince of Wales. When Henry became king, Lewis was promoted to become an Esquire of the Chamber. He officially became royal standard-bearer in 1420, and continued as a permanent member of the royal household, later becoming Chamberlain to the young King Henry VI.

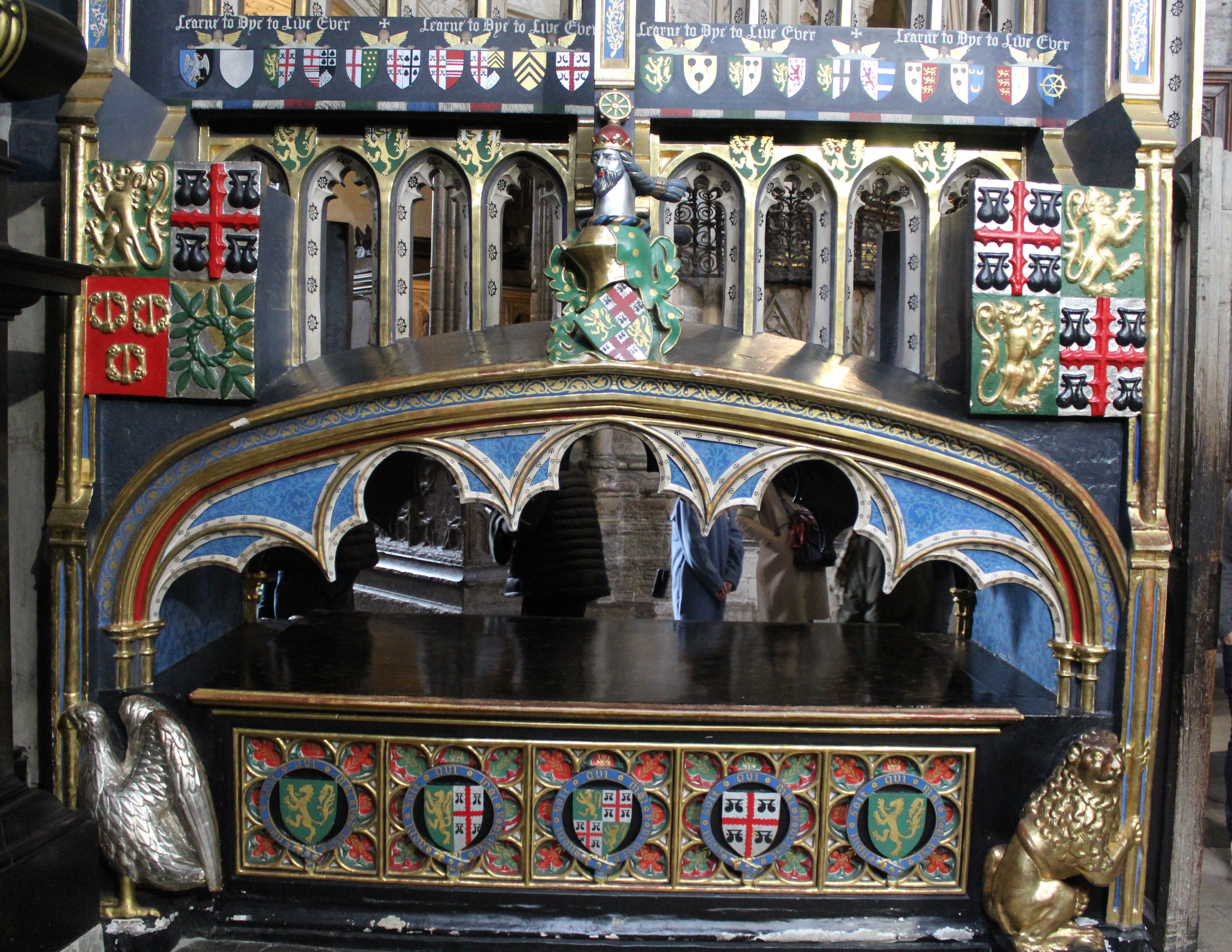
Tomb of Lewis Robessart, Westminster Abbey

In 1415 he was given the manor of Mapelhurst in Kent and an annuity. For his service, the king later granted him the manor of Postedhalle in Norfolk, one of the properties forfeited by the disgraced Sir John Oldcastle. In 1417 he obtained "letters of denization", entitling him to settle in England and acquire property there. By 1422 he had purchased the manors of Redenhall, Aldeburgh, Denton, Mendham and Pulham.

In 1420 he was given special responsibility for the care of Henry's bride, Catherine of Valois. On 3 May 1421, he was admitted to the Order of the Garter. Around this time he married Elizabeth, the widow of Hugh Stafford, 1st Baron Stafford, who had died in 1420.

Lewis was killed in France in 1430, while fighting against the French at Conty, a year after attending the coronation of King Henry VI, at Reims. His tomb, at the Chapel of St Paul in Westminster Abbey, was one of the first to display symbols of the Order of the Garter.
