= Jeton =

Coin-like counting token

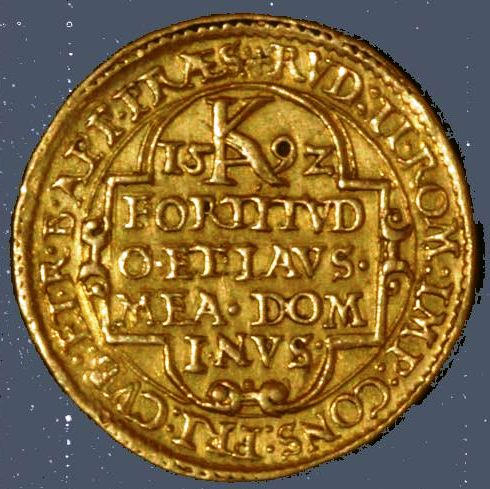
Gold jeton, Popel of Lobkowicz by Engelhart, Prague 1592, Ø 24 millimetres (0.94 in)

Jetons or jettons are tokens or coin-like medals produced across Europe from the 13th through the 18th centuries. They were produced as counters for use in calculation on a counting board, a lined board similar to an abacus. Jetons for calculation were commonly used in Europe from about 1200 to 1700, and remained in occasional use into the early nineteenth century. They also found use as a money substitute in games, similar to modern casino chips or poker chips.

Thousands of different jetons exist, mostly of religious and educational designs, as well as portraits, the last of which most resemble coinage, somewhat similar to modern, non-circulation commemorative coins. The spelling "jeton" is from the French; it is sometimes spelled "jetton" in English.

== Roman calculi ==
The Romans similarly used pebbles (in Latin: calculi "little stones", whence English calculate). Addition and subtraction is straightforward, and relatively efficient algorithms for multiplication and division were known.

== Middle Ages ==
The custom of stamping jetons like coins began in France, with the oldest known coming from the fiscal offices of the royal government of France and dating from around the middle of the 13th century. From the late 13th century to the end of the 14th century, jetons were produced in England, similar in design to contemporary Edwardian pennies. Although they were made of brass they were often pierced or indented at the centre to avoid them being plated with silver and passed off as real silver coins. By the middle of the 14th century, English jetons were being produced in a larger size, similar to the groat.

Throughout the 15th century competition from France and the Low Countries ended jeton manufacture in England, but not for long. Nuremberg jeton masters initially started by copying jetons of their European neighbours, but by the mid 16th century they gained a monopoly by mass-producing cheaper jetons for commercial use. Later – "counter casting" being obsolete – production shifted to jetons for use in games and toys, sometimes copying more or less famous jetons with a political background.

Mints in the Low Countries in the late Middle Ages in general produced the jetons for official bookkeeping. Most of them show the effigy of the ruler within a flattering text and on the reverse the ruler's escutcheon and the name or city of the accounting office.

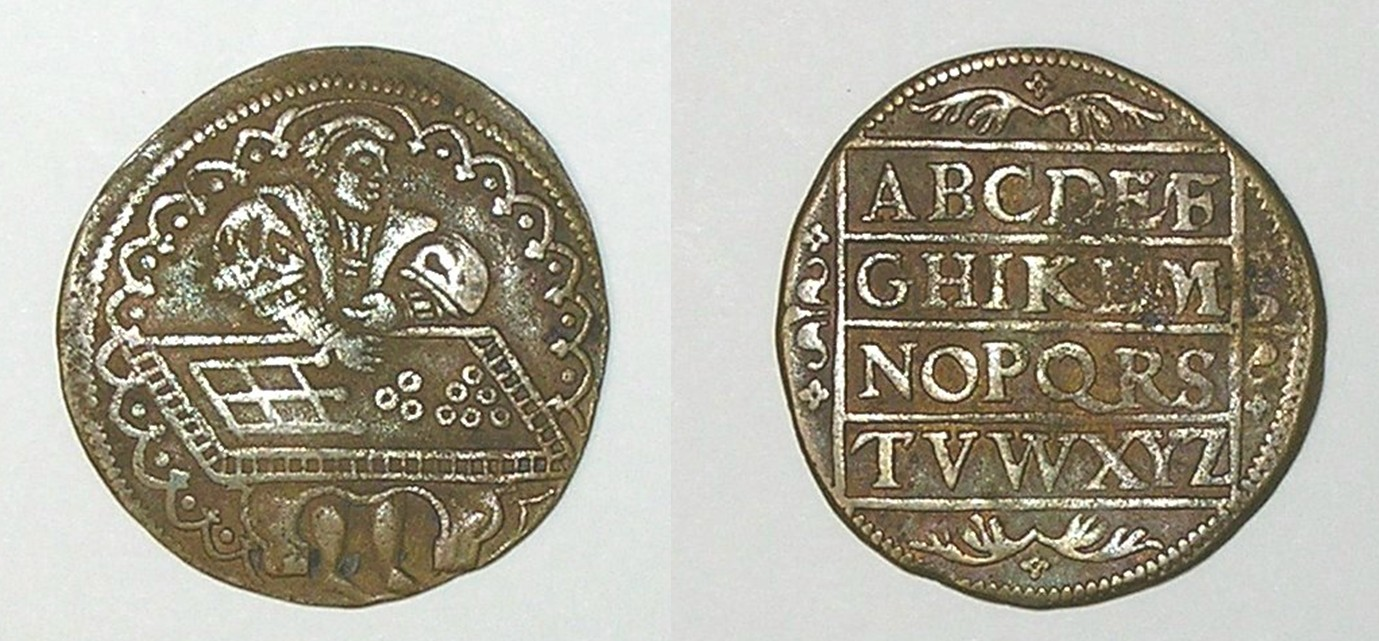
Nuremberg, c. 1553, moneychanger, Ø 28 mm.

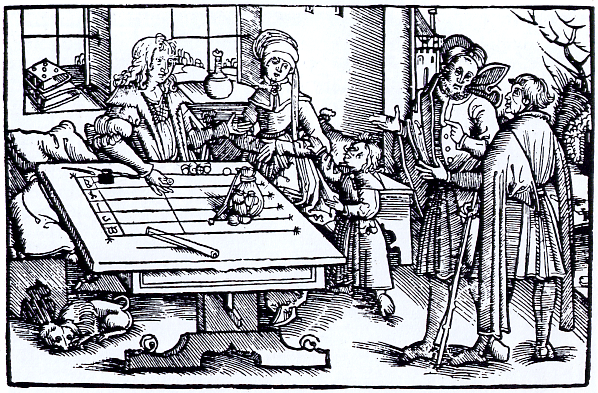
Counting board (woodcut, probably from Strasbourg). The lines and the spaces between the lines function like the wires or rods on an abacus. The place value is marked at the end.

During the Dutch Revolt (1568–1609) this pattern changed and by both parties, the North in front, about 2,000 different, mostly political, jetons (Dutch: Rekenpenning) were minted depicting the victories, ideals and aims. Specifically in the last quarter of the 16th century, where geuzen or "beggars" made important military contributions to the Dutch side and bookkeeping was already done without jetons, the production in the North was just for propaganda.

The mints and treasuries of the big estates in Central Europe used their own jetons and then had a number of them struck in gold and silver as New Year gifts for their employees, who in turn commissioned jetons with their own mottoes and coats-of-arms. In the sixteenth century the Czech Royal Treasury bought between two and three thousand pieces at the beginning of each year.

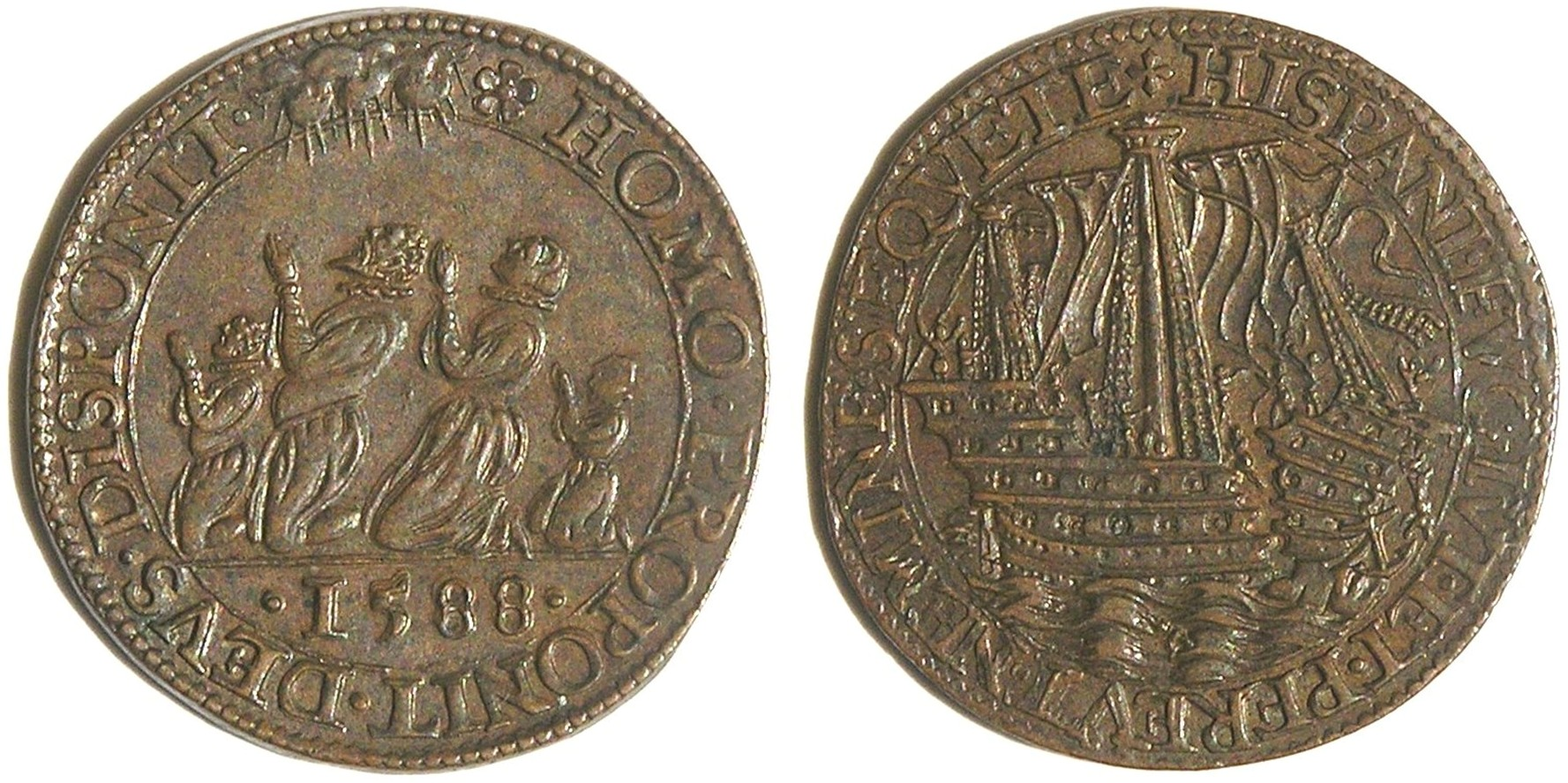
Dordrecht 1588, invincible Armada destroyed, Ø 30 mm.

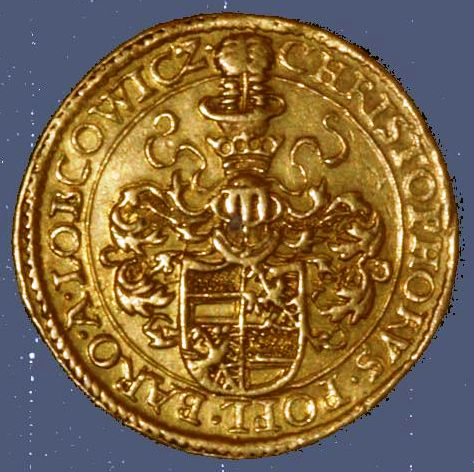
Christoph of Lobkowicz counter produced by D. Engelhart in 1592.

As Arabic numerals and the zero came into use, "pen reckoning" gradually displaced "counter casting" as the common accounting method.

== Modern use ==
=== In commerce ===
In the 21st century, jetons continue to be used in some countries as telephone tokens or gettone in coin-operated public telephones or in vending machines. They are usually made of metal or hard plastic. In German the word Jeton refers specifically to casino tokens. In Polish the word żeton, pronounced similarly to French jeton, refers both to tokens used in vending machines, phones etc. and to those used in casinos. The word жетон has the same use in Russian, as does the word jeton in Romanian and žetoon in Estonian. However, in Hungary the word zseton is (somewhat dated) slang for money, particularly coins. Plastic jetons used to be used for paying the fare for the Star Ferry in Hong Kong.

Beer festivals in France, Belgium, Luxembourg, and the Netherlands will often explicitly use the term "jeton" to describe the plastic, pre-paid tokens which are used in exchange of individual pours of beer samples from vendors at these events.

=== Leisure use ===
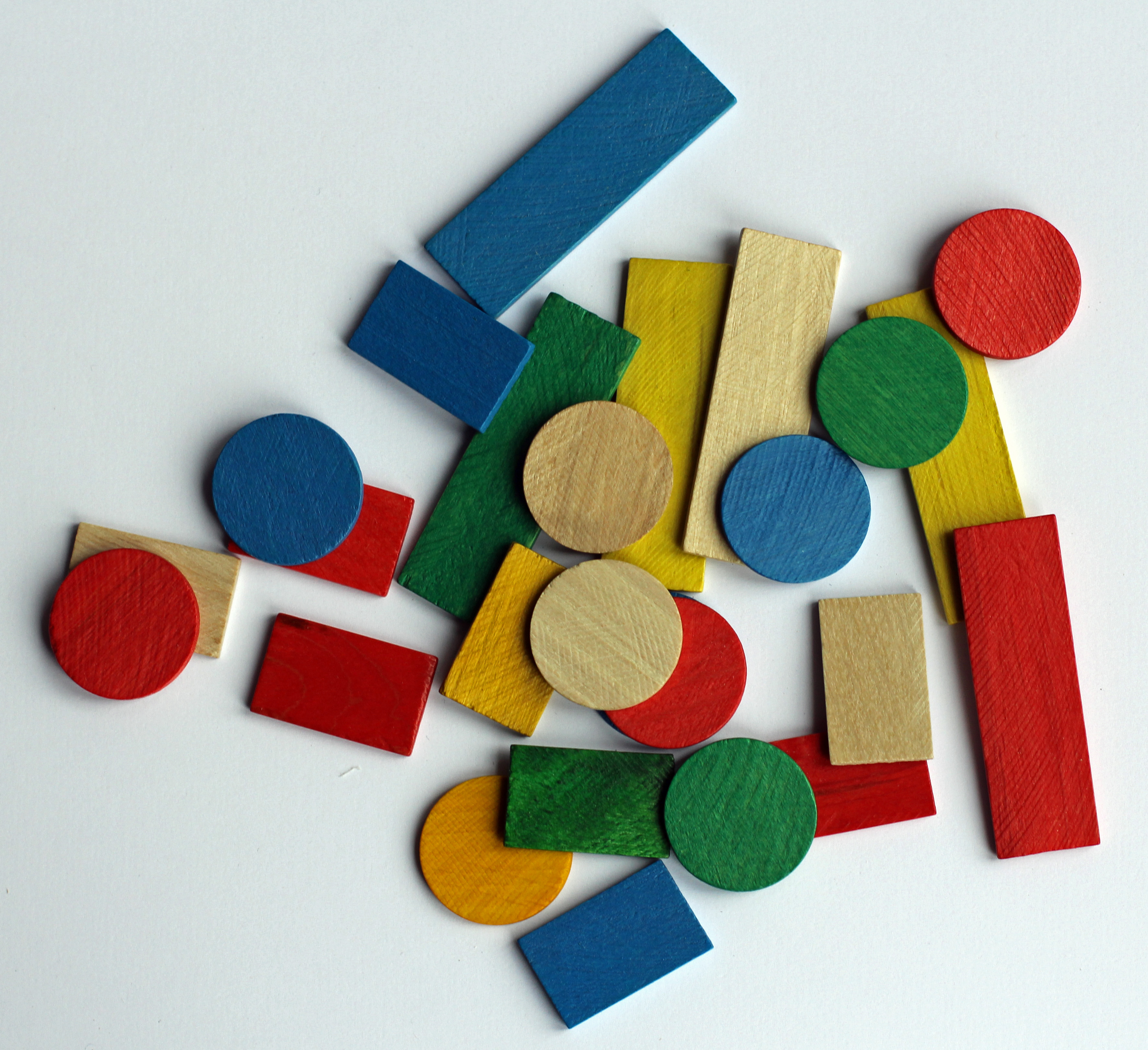
Coloured wooden counters of the type used in card games. The jetons are the round counters

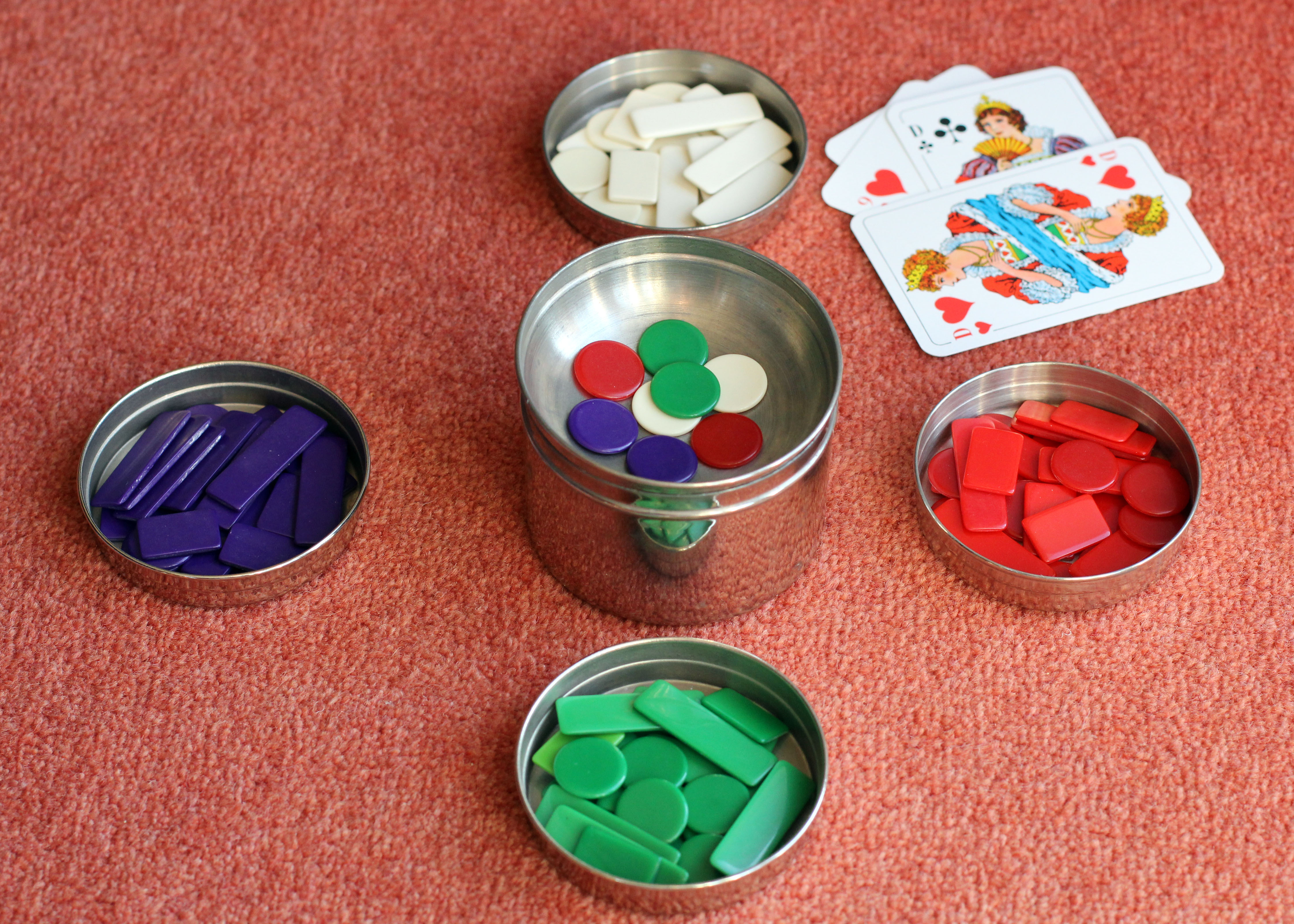
A virapulla set

Apart from their monetary use in casinos, jetons are used in card games, particularly in France but also in Denmark. They are traditionally made of wood, bone, or plastic of different shapes and sizes to represent different values such as 1, 5, 10, 50 or 100 points. For example, in traditional French games, jetons are round and usually worth 1 unit; fiches are long and rectangular in shape and may be worth 10 to 20 jetons; contrats are the short rectangular counters and may be worth, say, 100 units. In the game of Boston, each player has five jetons, which represent one hundred each; twenty fiches, which represent fifties, and twenty contrats, which represent fives. In Tresillo (the Spanish variant of ombre), each player has instead ten fiches, representing one each; ten jetons, representing five; and ten contrats, representing ten.

The jetons are also stained or coloured so that each player can have his or her own colour. This facilitates scoring because players do not need to start with exactly the same number of counters. Nowadays plastic jetons are a cheap alternative. Games that typically use jetons include Nain Jaune, Belote, Piquet, Ombre, Mistigri, Danish Tarok, Boston and Vira. A dedicated box called virapulla, containing four smaller boxes of jetons of different colours, is used to contain Vira jetons.

=== Other uses ===
In France and other countries a jeton is also a token amount of money paid to members of a society or a legislative chamber each time they are present in a meeting.

== See also ==
- Casino token
- Devotional medal
- Location arithmetic
- Telephone token
- Gettone
