= National Transport Tokens (UK) =

National Transport Tokens were used in lieu of, or in combination with, regular currency when paying for public transport in the United Kingdom.

The tokens were usually purchased by the local authority or welfare organisations. They could be used on most public transport services. Before the scheme closed, tokens were available in denominations of 10p, 20p, 50p and £1.

== History ==
The National Transport Token scheme evolved from the practice of many local authorities in the UK of issuing concessionary fare tokens to certain groups of people under their jurisdiction. In 1967, Manchester Corporation and Droylsden Urban District Council combined their concessionary fare initiatives to produce a token available across both boroughs. With the creation of the SELNEC (South East Lancashire, North East Cheshire) Passenger Transport Executive in 1969, this was expanded across the wider North West area as other local authorities became interested. New tokens were produced for the combined wider area, labelled "North West Public Transport Token". Only 2p and 3p denominations were produced.

With the setting up of the company "National Transport Tokens LTD" in 1972, the scheme began to expand to further areas, and when the name on the token no longer became geographically accurate, the tokens were changed to read "Public Transport Token". Again only 2p and 3p values were available. This was subsequently changed to the "National Transport Token" name used latterly and gradually larger denominations, including 5p, up to £1, became available.

National Transport Tokens ceased to be supplied to customers from 30 April 2018 and the scheme closed permanently on 31 October 2018.
