= Baron Bourchier =

Canting arms of Bourchier: Argent, a cross engrailed gules between four water bougets sable

The title Baron Bourchier is an abeyant peerage which was created in the Peerage of England in 1342 for Sir Robert Bourchier, who had been Lord High Chancellor of England from 1340–41.

The title passed through the male line until the death of the third baron in 1409 when it passed to his only daughter, Elizabeth. Upon her death in 1433, it was inherited by her cousin, Henry, who was later created Viscount Bourchier in 1446 and Earl of Essex in 1461. On the death of the 2nd Earl of Essex (the 1st earl's grandson) in 1540, the title passed to his only child, Anne. She was married to Lord Parr (later created Earl of Essex in 1543 and Marquess of Northampton in 1547) who later divorced Anne and had their children declared illegitimate so they were unable to inherit the barony. When Anne died in 1571, the title passed to her cousin Lord Hereford, who was later created Earl of Essex in 1572. When the 3rd Earl of Essex died without male heirs in 1646, the barony became abeyant between his sisters, the Duchess of Somerset and Lady Dorothy Stafford and their descendants.

== Barons Bourchier (1342) ==
- Robert Bourchier, 1st Baron Bourchier (d. 1349)
- John Bourchier, 2nd Baron Bourchier (d. 1400)
- Bartholomew Bourchier, 3rd Baron Bourchier (d. 1409)
- Elizabeth Bourchier, 4th Baroness Bourchier (c.1399–1433)

First husband: Hugh Stafford, jure uxoris 4th Baron Bourchier, later 1st Baron Stafford (d. 1420)
Second husband: Lewis Robessart, jure uxoris 4th Baron Bourchier (d. 1431)

- Henry Bourchier, 1st Earl of Essex, 1st Viscount Bourchier, 5th Baron Bourchier (c.1404–1483)
- Henry Bourchier, 2nd Earl of Essex, 2nd Viscount Bourchier, 6th Baron Bourchier (c.1472–1540)
- Anne Bourchier, 7th Baroness Bourchier (d. 1571)

Husband: William Parr, 1st Marquess of Northampton (c.1512–1571)

- Walter Devereux, 1st Earl of Essex, 8th Baron Bourchier (1541–1576)
- Robert Devereux, 2nd Earl of Essex, 9th Baron Bourchier (1566–1601)
- Robert Devereux, 3rd Earl of Essex, 10th Baron Bourchier (1591–1646), abeyant.
