= Gettone =

Italian telephone token

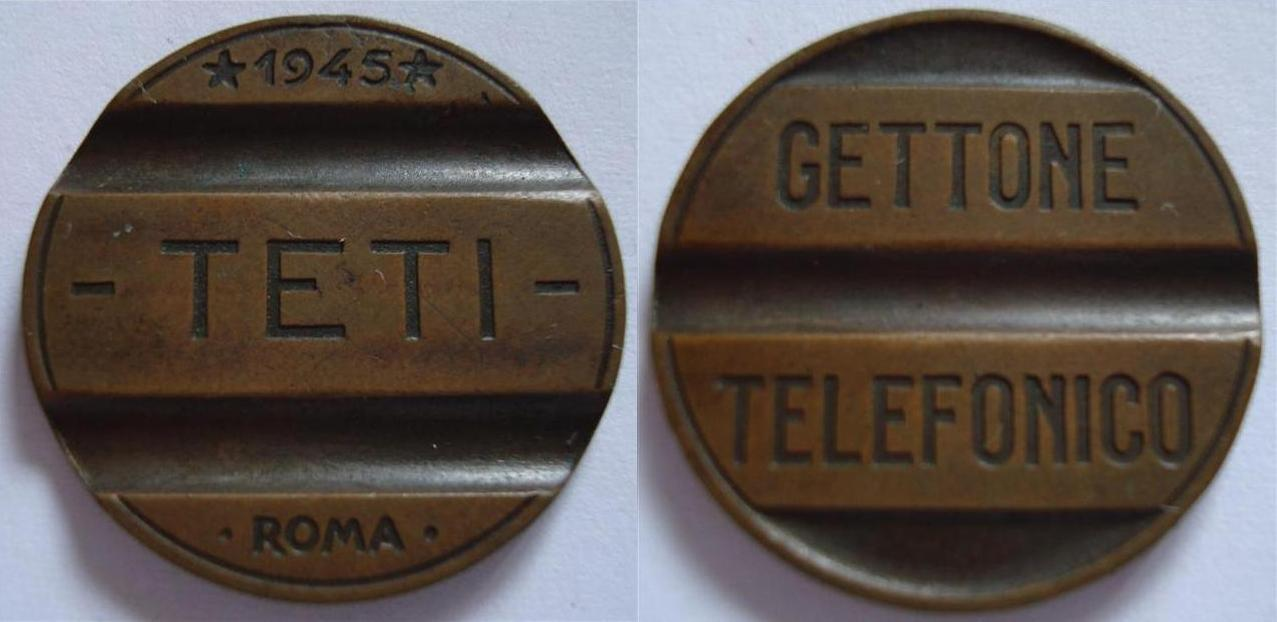
"Gettone telefonico" from 1945.

Gettone means "token" in Italian. More specifically, the word gettone can be used to refer to the gettone telefonico (telephone token), which was used during much of the 20th century in Italian telephone booths.

The gettone was introduced in 1927 by STIPEL and subsequently adopted by other telephone companies. The last version of it (as reproduced in the picture below) was produced from 1959 to 1980. In this last version, the gettone had the date marked on it in the form of a four digit number at the bottom of the obverse side of the token. The first two digits represent the year in which the token was minted. The last two digits represent the month. Example: "7805" represents "May 1978". Its use ceased in 2001, coinciding with the upcoming introduction of the euro currency in 2002.

== Gettone as means of payment ==
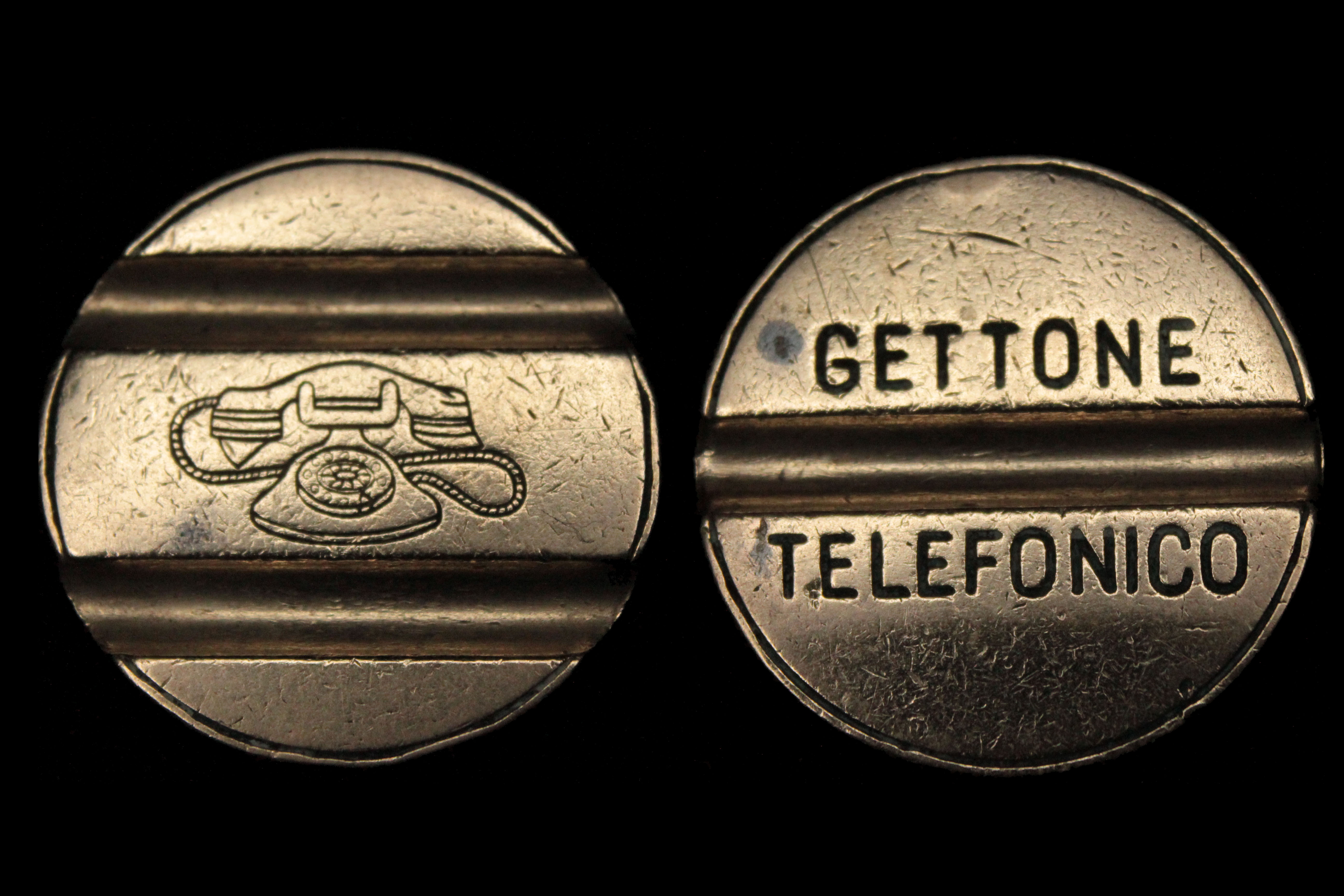
Gettone telefonico used from 1959 to 2001.

In the 1970s the value of the metal used in Italian small coins had reached a higher value than the face value. This led to a coin shortage in the market, forcing the circulating use of gettoni, stamps, and bus tickets for small transactions or part exchanges of a larger payment.

Gettoni became so common and so well known that they were considered legal tender, almost always being accepted as payment. One gettone was valued 50 lire up to 1980, 100 lire up to 1984, and 200 lire from 1984. The gettone thus became known as a typical Italian item even outside of Italy.

== See also ==
- Telephone token
- Jeton
