= Humphrey Bourchier, 1st Baron Cromwell =

English nobleman (d. 1471)

Humphrey Bourchier, 1st Baron Cromwell (died 14 April 1471) was an English nobleman who took part in the Wars of the Roses.

Bourchier was the third son of Henry Bourchier, 1st Earl of Essex and his wife Isabel of Cambridge, Countess of Essex. He married Joan Stanhope, the younger daughter of Sir Richard Stanhope and coheiress of Ralph Cromwell, 3rd Baron Cromwell, who died at the beginning of 1456. (The other coheiress, Joan's elder sister, Maud, had married Sir Thomas Neville.) On 2 March 1456, Bourchier was appointed Constable of Nottingham Castle and Warden of Sherwood Forest, offices previously held by Cromwell; he and Neville also received a joint appointment to Cromwell's office of Chamberlain of the Exchequer. They were removed from the chamberlaincy in 1459 in favor of the Lancastrian Sir Richard Tunstall.

Neville was killed at the Battle of Wakefield in 1460; when Edward IV ascended the throne in 1461, Bourchier was again appointed to the chamberlaincy. He was also summoned to Parliament as Baron Cromwell, or Bourchier de Cromwell. The doctrine of abeyance for peerages was not rigidly developed at the time; it is unclear whether Bourchier was summoned jure uxoris by settling his uncle-in-law's barony of Cromwell on Joan alone, or as a new creation in his own right, the latter being more probable. Cromwell deputized his duties at the Exchequer to John Leynton in 1465.

Cromwell was killed fighting for Edward at the Battle of Barnet on 14 April 1471 and was buried at Westminster Abbey. His one son by Joan, Ralph, predeceased him and his barony became extinct. His widow married Sir Robert Radcliffe in 1472 and died in 1490, also without children.

== Notes ==
Peerage of England
New creation	Baron Cromwell; 1461–1471	Extinct
