= Claud Thomas Bourchier =

Recipient of the Victoria Cross

Claud Thomas Bourchier VC
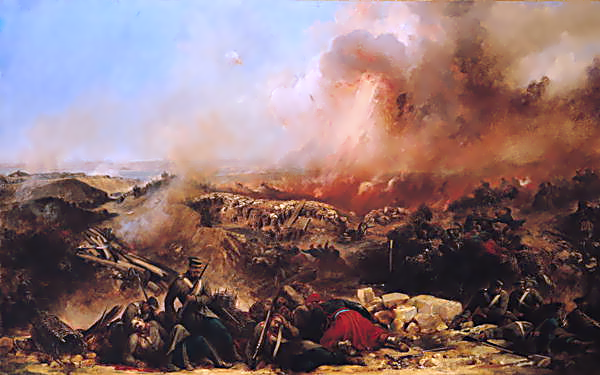
- Depiction of the Siege of Sebastopol
- Born: 22 April 1831; Brayford, Devon
- Died: 19 November 1877 (aged 46); Hove, Sussex
- Burial place: St Andrew's Churchyard, Buxton
- Military career
- Allegiance: United Kingdom
- Branch: British Army
- Service years: 1849–1876
- Rank: Colonel
- Units: Rifle Brigade
- Conflicts: Crimean War; Indian Mutiny
- Awards: Victoria Cross

Colonel Claud Thomas Bourchier (22 April 1831 – 19 November 1877) was an English recipient of the Victoria Cross, the highest and most prestigious award for gallantry in the face of the enemy that can be awarded to British and Commonwealth forces.

He was 23 years old, and a lieutenant in the 1st Battalion, The Rifle Brigade (Prince Consort's Own), British Army during the Crimean War when the following deed took place for which he was awarded the VC.

== Action ==
On 20 November 1854 at Sebastopol, Crimea, Lieutenant Bourchier, with another lieutenant (William James Montgomery Cuninghame) was with a party detailed to drive the Russians from some rifle pits. Advancing on the pits after dark they launched a surprise attack and drove the Russian riflemen from their cover, but in the fierce fighting which ensued the officer in command of the party was killed. The two lieutenants, however, maintained their advantage, withstood all attacks from the enemy during the night and held the position until relieved next day.

He later achieved the rank of colonel. In later life he was a member of Boodle's club in St James's, London.

His Victoria Cross is displayed at the Royal Green Jackets (Rifles) Museum, Winchester, England.
