= Elizabeth Bourchier, 4th Baroness Bourchier =

English noblewoman (died c. 1432)

Elizabeth Bourchier, 4th Baroness Bourchier (c.1399–1432) was an English noblewoman and landowner.

She was the daughter of Bartholomew Bourchier, 3rd Baron Bourchier. She married twice, and both husbands acquired the title of Baron Bourchier in iure uxoris.

Elizabeth Bourchier's mother was the former Idonea Lovey, Bartholomew's second wife. She inherited the barony when Bartholomew died in 1409.

She first married Hugh Stafford, 1st Baron Stafford, a younger son of Hugh Stafford, 2nd Earl of Stafford. The marriage took place some time before 1411, when he was first summoned to Parliament in right of the barony of Bourchier. He died in 1420.

She married her second husband, Sir Lewis Robessart (died 1430), before 1425 when he was summoned to Parliament as Baron Bourchier. Sir Lewis was Chamberlain to King Henry VI of England. There were no children from either marriage.

Elizabeth Bourchier was buried at Westminster Abbey with her second husband, Sir Lewis Robessart. Since she died childless, the barony was inherited by her second cousin Henry Bourchier, 1st Earl of Essex (1404–1483).
