= Henry Bourchier, 1st Earl of Essex =

English nobleman (c. 1405–1483)

Henry Bourchier
- 5th Baron Bourchier; 1st Viscount Bourchier; Earl of Essex
- Canting arms of Bourchier: Argent, a cross engrailed gules between four water bougets sable
- Born: c. 1404–1406
- Died: 4 April 1483 (aged 76–79)
- Noble family: Bourchier
- Spouse: Isabel of York
- Issue: William Bourchier, Viscount Bourchier; Humphrey Bourchier, 1st Baron Cromwell; John Bourchier; Edward Bourchier; Thomas Bourchier; Florence Bourchier; Fulk Bourchier; Hugh Bourchier; Isabella Bourchier
- Father: William Bourchier, Count of Eu
- Mother: Anne of Gloucester

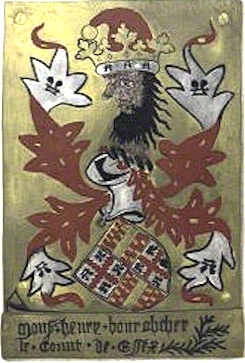
Garter stall plate of Henry Bourchier, 1st Earl of Essex, 2nd Count of Eu (1404–1483), nominated as a Knight of the Garter in 1452. St George's Chapel, Windsor Castle. Inscribed below: "Mons. Henry Bourcheher le Count de Essex". Arms: Quarterly 1st & 4th: Bourchier; 2nd & 3rd: Gules billety or a fess of the last (sometimes a fess argent) (Louvain, feudal barons of Little Easton, Essex, for the mother of the 1st Count of Eu, Eleanor de Louvain (d.1397)). Crest: A man's (Moor's) head in profile proper ducally crowned or with a pointed cap gules The Bourchier bougets appear on the mantling

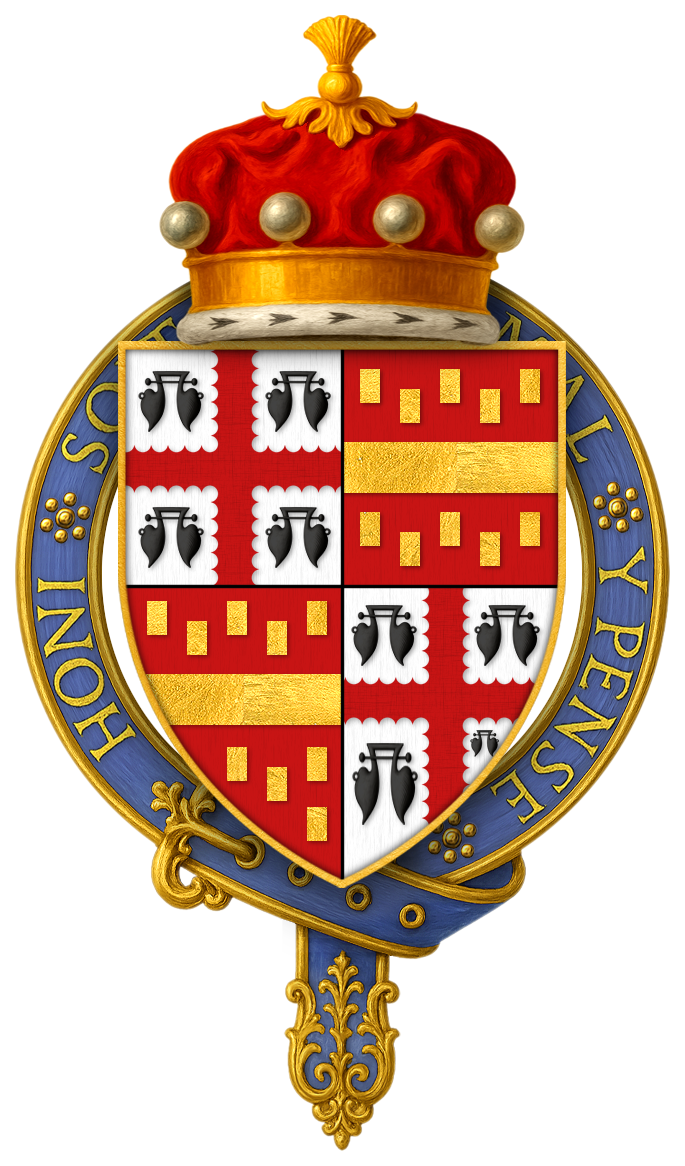
Arms of Sir Henry Bourchier, 5th Baron Bourchier, at the time of his installation into the Most Noble Order of the Garter: Quarterly 1st & 4th: Argent, a cross engrailed gules between four water bougets sable (Bourchier); 2nd & 3rd: Gules billety or, a fess of the last (Louvain of Little Easton) the whole surrounded by the Garter

Henry Bourchier, 5th Baron Bourchier, 2nd Count of Eu, 1st Viscount Bourchier, 1st Earl of Essex (c. 1404-1406 – 4 April 1483), was the eldest son of William Bourchier, 1st Count of Eu, and Anne of Gloucester. On his mother's side, he was a great-grandson of Edward III of England.

== Titles ==
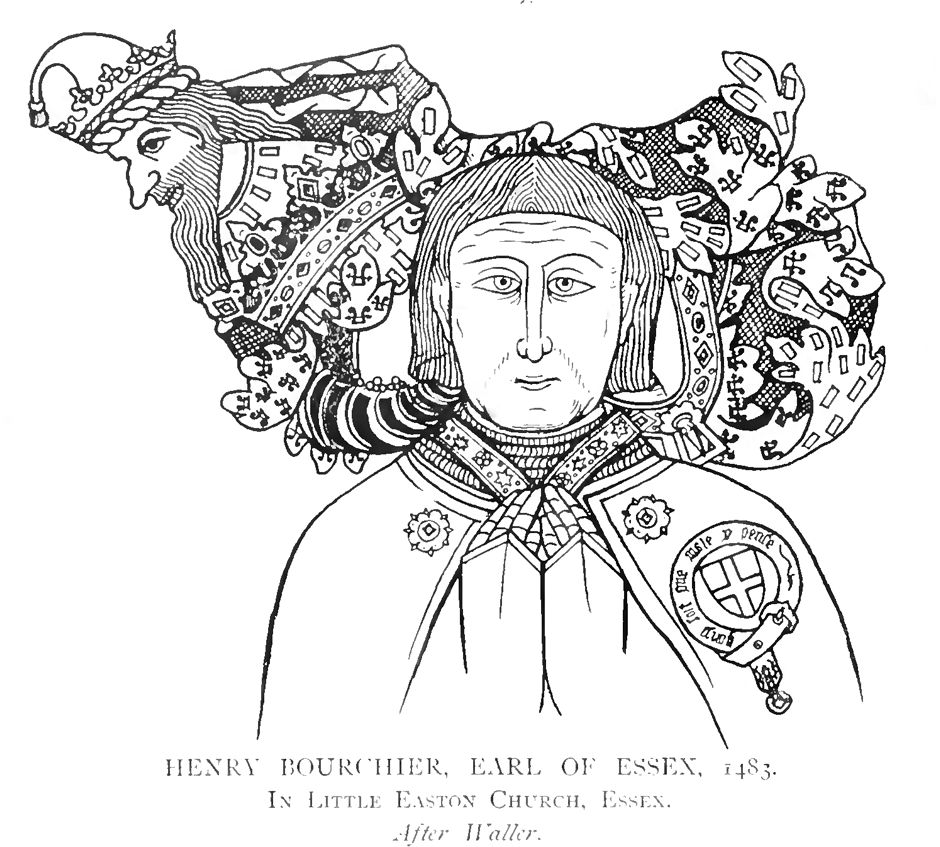
Henry Bourchier, 1st Earl of Essex

He inherited the title of 5th Baron Bourchier from his cousin Elizabeth Bourchier, 4th Baroness Bourchier on her death in 1433. He became the 1st Viscount Bourchier in 1446, a Knight of the Order of the Garter in 1452, and was created 1st Earl of Essex in 1461.

== Career ==
Henry saw considerable military action in France and for his services was created Viscount Bourchier during the parliament of 1445–6. He was elected Knight of the Garter on his third nomination in 1452. He later saw action in 1461 as a Yorkist supporter at the Second Battle of St Albans and the Battle of Towton, soon after which Edward IV created him Earl of Essex.

He held the post of Lord High Treasurer from 29 May 1455 to 5 October 1456, 28 July 1460 to 14 April 1462 and 22 April 1471 to 4 April 1483. He also became Justice in Eyre south of the Trent in 1461, holding that title until his death. Bourchier's tenure as Lord High Treasurer occurred during the Great Bullion Famine and the Great Slump in England.

He died on 4 April 1483 and was buried at Beeleigh Abbey, although his tomb was subsequently moved to Little Easton church.

== Marriage and issue ==
Prior to 1426, he married Isabel of Cambridge, a great-granddaughter of Edward III. She was the elder sister of Richard Plantagenet, which made her the aunt of Richard's sons, the future kings Edward IV and Richard III.

Henry and Isabel were parents to at least eleven children.

- William Bourchier, Viscount Bourchier (d. 1480). Married Anne Woodville, daughter of Richard Woodville, 1st Earl Rivers and Jacquetta of Luxembourg. They were parents of Henry Bourchier, 2nd Earl of Essex and Cicely Bourchier, wife of John Devereux, 9th Baron Ferrers of Chartley.
- Henry Bourchier (d. 1462). Married Elizabeth de Scales, Baroness Scales. No known children.
- Humphrey Bourchier, 1st Baron Cromwell (d. 14 April 1471). Killed in the Battle of Barnet.
- John Bourchier (d. 1495). Married first Elizabeth Ferrers and secondly Elizabeth Chichele. No known children.
- Edward Bourchier (d. 30 December 1460). Killed in the Battle of Wakefield.
- Thomas Bourchier (d. 1492). Married Isabella Barre. No known children.
- Florence Bourchier (d. 1525).
- Fulk Bourchier. Considered to have died young.
- Hugh Bourchier. Considered to have died young.
- Isabella Bourchier. Considered to have died young.

On his death, she did not remarry and died more than a year later.

== Ancestry ==
Ancestors of Henry Bourchier, 1st Earl of Essex

16. John Bourchier
8. Robert Bourchier
17. Helen Colchester
4. Sir William Bourchier
18. Thomas Prayers
9. Margaret Prayers
19. Margaret de Essex
2. William Bourchier, 1st Count of Eu
20. Thomas de Louvaine
10. Sir John de Louvaine
21. Joan de Basing
5. Alianore de Lovayne
22. Sir Thomas Weston
11. Margaret Weston
1. Henry Bourchier, 1st Earl of Essex
24. Edward II of England
12. Edward III of England
25. Isabella of France
6. Thomas of Woodstock, 1st Duke of Gloucester
26. William I, Count of Hainaut
13. Philippa of Hainault
27. Joan of Valois
3. Anne of Gloucester
28. William de Bohun, 1st Earl of Northampton
14. Humphrey de Bohun, 7th Earl of Hereford
29. Elizabeth de Badlesmere
7. Eleanor de Bohun
30. Richard Fitzalan, 10th Earl of Arundel
15. Joan Fitzalan
31. Eleanor of Lancaster

== Bibliography ==
- Clark, Linda (2008). "Bourchier, Henry, first earl of Essex (c. 1408–1483)". Oxford Dictionary of National Biography (online) (online ed.). Oxford University Press. doi:10.1093/ref:odnb/2987. ISBN 978-0-19-861412-8. (Subscription, Wikipedia Library access or UK public library membership required.)
- Collins, Hugh E. L. (2000). The Order of the Garter, 1348-1461: Chivalry and Politics in Late Medieval England. Clarendon Press. ISBN 9780198208174.

Political offices
Preceded by James Butler	Lord High Treasurer; 1455–1456	Succeeded by John Talbot
Preceded by James Butler	Lord High Treasurer; 1460–1461	Succeeded by John Tiptoft
Preceded by John Tiptoft	Lord High Treasurer; 1471–1483	Succeeded by John Wood
Peerage of England
New creation	Earl of Essex; 5th creation 1461–1483	Succeeded by Henry Bourchier
New creation	Viscount Bourchier; 1446–1483	Succeeded by Henry Bourchier
Preceded by Elizabeth Bourchier	Baron Bourchier; 1433–1483	Succeeded by Henry Bourchier
