= John Bourchier, 6th Baron Ferrers of Groby =

English noble (c. 1428 – 1495)

John Bourchier
- Born: c. 1428; Halstead, Essex, England
- Died: 3 November 1495; Halstead, Essex, England
- Spouse: Elizabeth Grey (m. 1462; died 1490) Elizabeth Chicheley (m. 1490; died 1495)
- Parents: Henry Bourchier, 1st Earl of Essex (father); Isabel of Cambridge, Countess of Essex (mother)

Sir John Bourchier (c. 1428 – 1495) was a 15th-century English knight and nobleman. He was steward of the Honour of Richmond. Bourchier fought in the Battle of Bosworth in 1485 on the side of King Richard III.

Bourchier was the fourth son of Henry Bourchier, 1st Earl of Essex and his wife Isabel of Cambridge, Countess of Essex.

Before 2 May 1462, Bourchier married to the heiress Lady Elizabeth Grey, widow of Sir Edward Grey, jure uxoris 6th Baron Ferrers of Groby (d. 18 December 1457). Lady Elizabeth was the granddaughter and heiress of William Ferrers, 5th Baron Ferrers of Groby in her own right. When Lady Ferrers remarried to Bourchier, he received the title of Baron Ferrers of Groby (jure uxoris). They had no issue. After the death of Lady Ferrers, Bourchier remarried to Elizabeth Chicheley before 6 July 1490.

Bourchier left a will dated 4 June 1495 in which he requested his burial in Beeleigh Abbey in Essex, next to the tomb of his parents.
