= John Bourchier, 2nd Baron Bourchier =

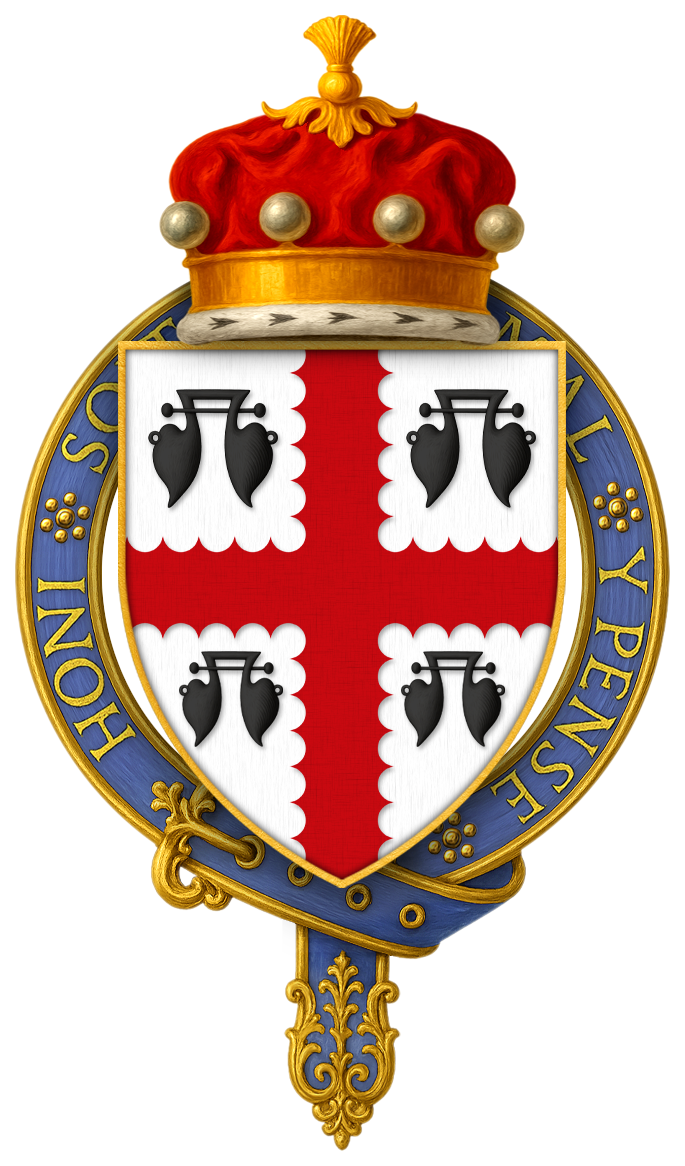
Canting arms of Sir John Bourchier, 2nd Baron Bourchier, KG: Argent, a cross engrailed gules between four water bougets sable, encircled by the Garter

John Bourchier, 2nd Baron Bourchier (died 21 May 1400), was a soldier and diplomat in the service of the Kingdom of England.

== Family ==
John was the eldest son of Robert Bourchier, 1st Baron Bourchier and his wife Margaret Prayers. He inherited the title when his father died in 1349, along with estates and property focused around Essex.

== Life ==
John followed his father in pursuing a military career, serving with Edward, the Black Prince in Gascony in 1355 and was at the Battle of Auray in 1364. Other known engagements include being one of the Council to the King's Lieutenant in France in 1370 and being part of the 1379 fleet that was unsuccessful in its attempt to support the Breton Army. In 1384, he was sent as Governor in Chief to Flanders, remaining for 18 months in Ghent.

He was summoned to Parliament regularly between 1381 and 1399 before being excused due to age and infirmities. He was made Knight of the Garter in 1392. He died 21 May 1400.

== Marriage and issue ==
He married, before 1374, Maud Coggeshall, daughter of Sir John Coggeshall. They had one known son.

- Bartholomew Bourchier, 3rd Baron Bourchier b. 1374, d. 18 May 1409
