= Exonumia =

Numismatic items other than coins and paper money

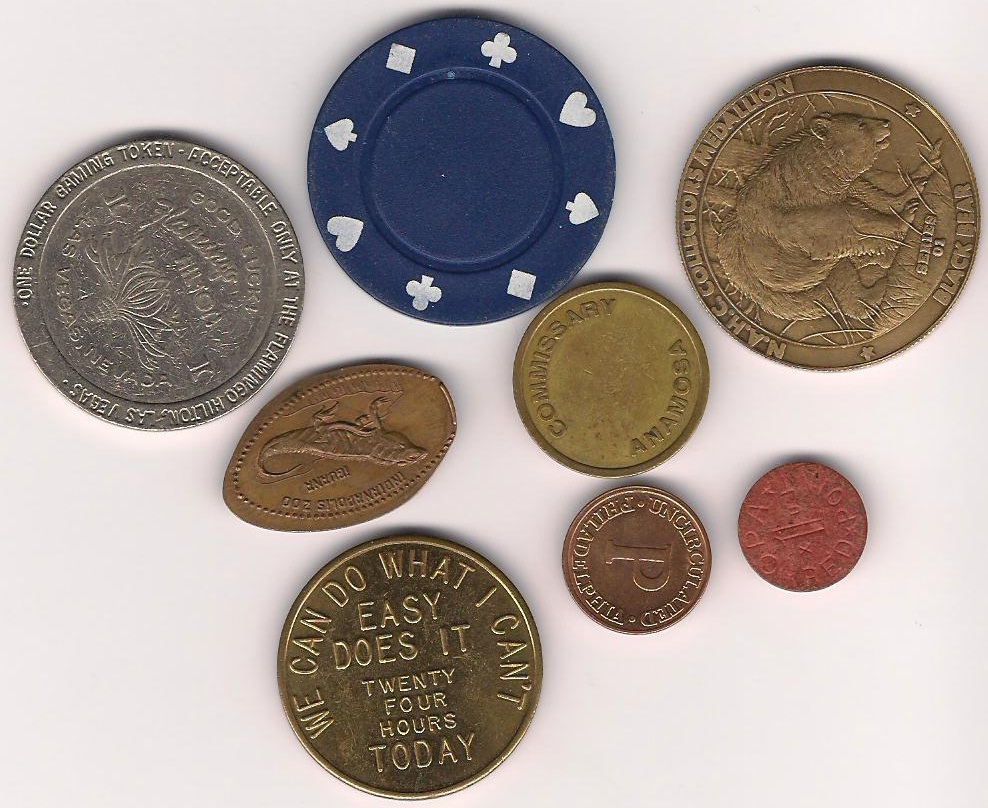
Assorted exonumia, including a poker chip and an elongated coin

Exonumia are numismatic items (such as tokens, medals, or scrip) other than coins and paper money. This includes "Good For" tokens, badges, counterstamped coins, elongated coins, encased coins, souvenir medallions, tags, wooden nickels and other similar items. It is an aspect of numismatics and many coin collectors are also exonumists.

Besides the above strict definition, others extend it to include non-coins which may or may not be legal tenders such as cheques, credit cards and similar paper.

== Etymology ==
The noun exonumia is derived from two classical roots: exo, meaning "out-of" in Greek, and nummus, meaning "coin" in Latin (from Greek νοῦμμος – noummos, "coin"); thus, "out[side]-of-[the category]coins". The equivalent British term, paranumismatica, may also be used.

The words exonumist and exonumia were coined in July 1960 by Russell Rulau, a recognized authority and author on the subject, and accepted by Webster's dictionary in 1965.

== Token coins ==
Many tokens were produced and used as currency in the United States and elsewhere when there was a shortage of government-issued money. Tokens have been used for both to advertise and to facilitate commerce and may or may not have a value.

Token authority Russell Rulau offers a broad definition for exonumia in his 1040 page tome, United States Tokens: 1700–1900 but lines between categories can be fuzzy. For example, an advertising token may also be considered a medal. Good For tokens may also advertise. Counter-stamped coins have been called "little billboards."

One way of parsing tokens is into these three general categories:

- Has a "value," facilitating commerce, such as Good for (something).
- Commemoration, remembrance, dedication, or the like, for some person, place, idea or event.
- Of a personal nature.

Typically, catalogs of tokens are organized by location, time period, and/or type of item. Historically, the need for tokens grew out of the need for currency. In America, some tokens legally circulated alongside or instead of currency. Hard Times Tokens and Civil War tokens each were the size of the contemporary cent. Afterwards, value based items, such as Good for (amount of money), Good for One Quart of Milk, Good for One Beer, Good for One Ride… and others were specifically linked to commerce of the store or place of issue.

== Medals ==
Medals are coin-like artistic objects, typically with a commemorative purpose. They may be awarded for recognition of achievement or created for sale to commemorate individuals or events. They may be souvenirs, devotional, or purely artistic. Medals are generally not used as currency or for exchange.

== Exonumia collecting ==
Exonumia collectors, like coin collectors, are attentive to condition and rarity, as well as to history, form and type. Exonumists may collect items by region, topic, type, shape or material and this affects the ways tokens are documented.

The following categories are typical. This is not all-inclusive but is a sampling of the wide variety of exonumia.

=== By type ===
Modified/augmented:

- Love Token: A coin with hand engraving, on one or both sides, or deliberately bent. Some were made by convicts prior to deportation. When bent, the coin indicated the taking of a vow.
- Carved Potty coins: usually United States Seated Liberty coinage carved to show lady Liberty sitting on a chamber pot.
- Hobo nickels: Initially, hand-engraved Buffalo nickels mostly in the era 1913–38. Now, applied more generally to hand-engraved coins of different denominations.
- Counterstamped/countermarked or chopped coins (done by merchants or governments)
- Cut Coins: artistically carved creations made from genuine coins, both new and old, often for jewelry (e.g. trade-dollar locket).
- Elongated coins: Rolled out with advertising, commemorative, or souvenir designs on one side
- Encased Coin: Generally in a ring with advertising
- Painted or enamelled coins
- Short snorter: paper money signed by people sharing a common experience
- Coin slabs: rare or sample slabs

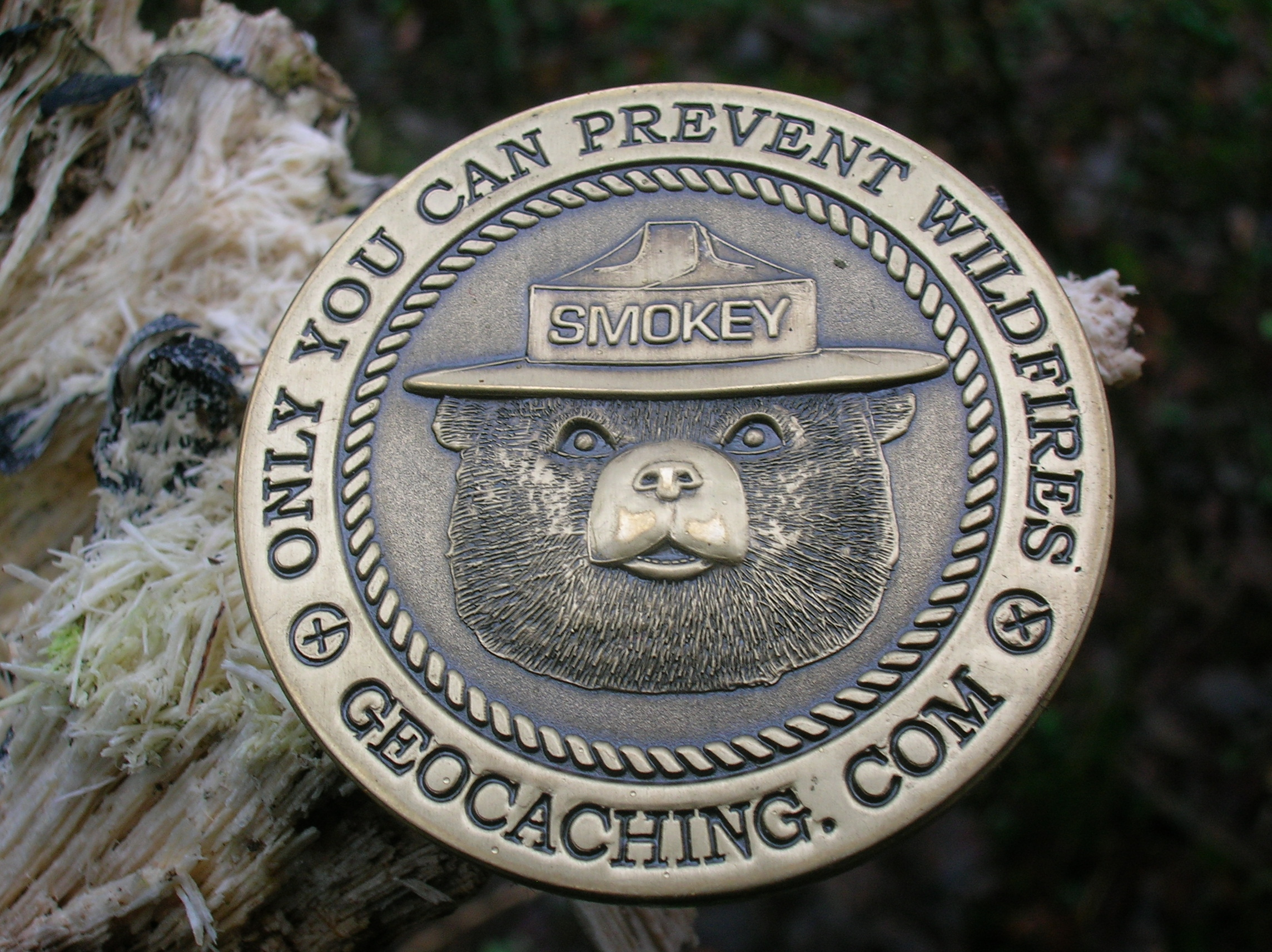
A Smokey Bear Geocoin

Play money / fantasy / counterfeit / art

- Play money or game counters (e.g. imitation guineas, whist tokens)
- Fantasy issue or novelty money (e.g. Promotional fake United States currency, Prop money)
- Mardi Gras Doubloons
- Counterfeit coins including evasion tokens (e.g. Blacksmith tokens)
- Money art

Government services & non-national tools to facilitate commerce

- Jetons: Used as counters when verifying totals or weights of coins for commerce and exchange
- Postal notes
- Telephone tokens/Gettoni
- Local currency, e.g. Ithaca Hours
- Sales tax tokens: Issued by states and merchants
- Ration tokens, e.g. OPA tokens
- Food stamps

Transportation tokens

- Ferries and watercraft
- Buses
- Subway
- Trains
- Trams/Trolleys

Closed community / membership

- Communion tokens: given to congregation members to permit them to participate in Holy Communion
- Company scrip
  - Bingle tokens
  - Lumber
  - Mining
- Ingle Credit System script
- Civilian Conservation Corps (CCC)
- College Currency
- Challenge coins
- Fraternal
  - Masonic
  - Elks
  - Moose
  - Woodmen of the World
- Geocoins used in geocaching
- Ghetto currency, e.g. Łódź Ghetto mark
- Leper colony money
- Méreau
- Military
  - Military payment certificate
  - Allied Military Currency
  - Japanese invasion money
  - canteen, mess hall, NCO club tokens
- Plantation
  - Picker tokens for crops
- Prison and Correctional/Asylums
- Sobriety coin

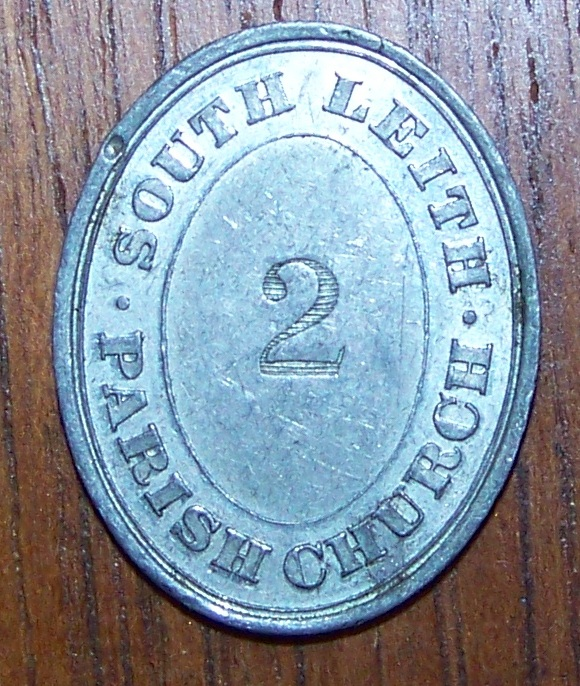
Obverse of a communion token from South Leith Parish Church

By material / shapes

- Wooden nickels
- Cardboard or paper
- Hard rubber or ebonite
- Porcelain money
- Bullion, e.g. non-legal tender silver rounds

Movements and ideals

- Temperance
- Anti-slavery, e.g. Wedgwood anti-slavery medallion
- Religious, e.g. Indian temple tokens, devotional medals, wedding tokens
- Political tokens, e.g. Bryan Money

Of a personal nature – personals

- Dog license tags
- Key tags (e.g. In case lost return to …)
- Badges
  - Company
  - Occupation
- Post office tags
- Slave tags: see Slave codes
- Watch fobs

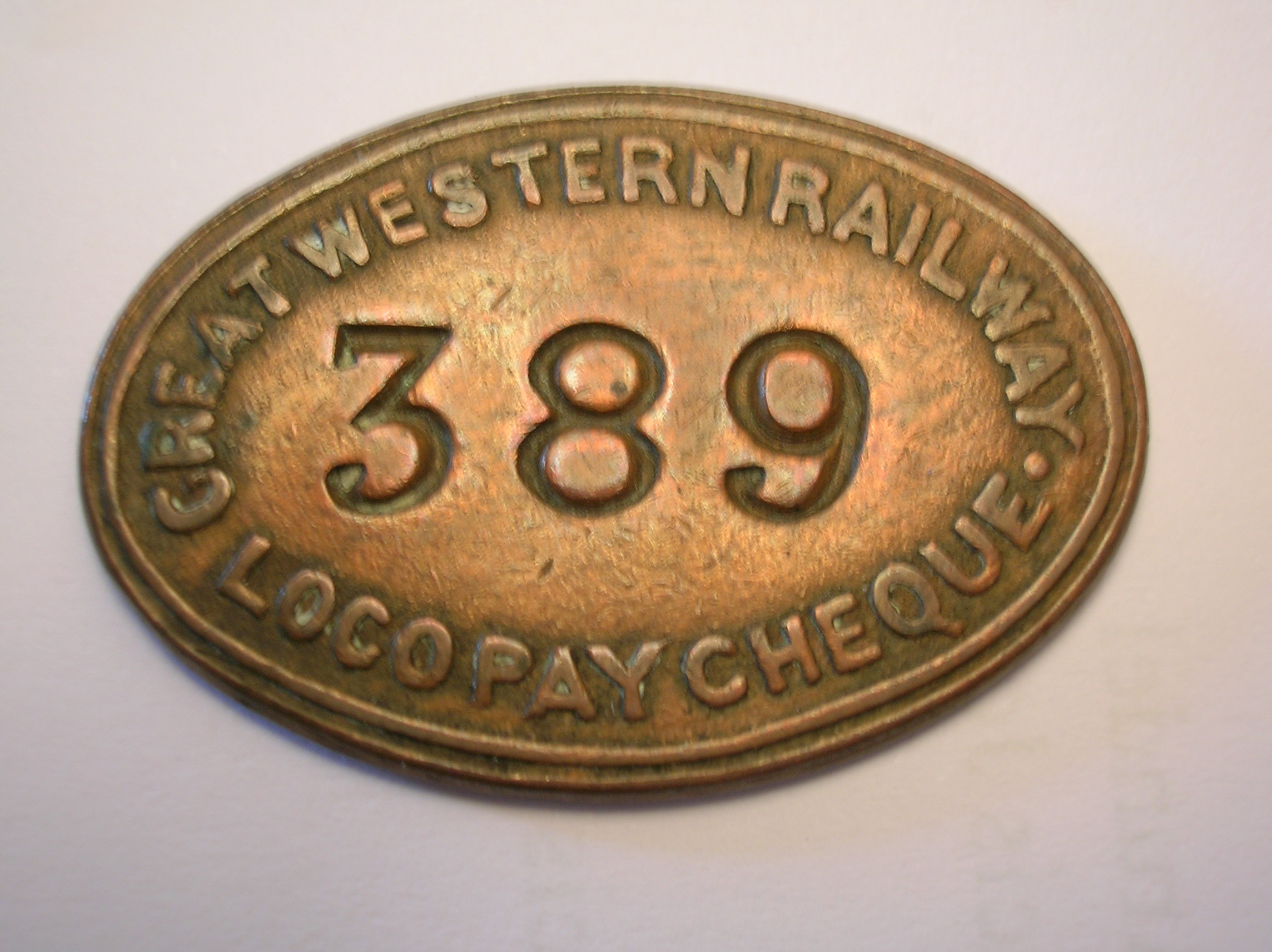
A Great Western Railway pay cheque

By issuer

- Arcade/Amusement tokens
- Apothecary tokens
- Bakery token
- Beer
- Pub/bar/saloon
- Billiards/pool
- Brothel tokens, e.g. spintriae
- Car wash tokens
- Casino/Slot tokens/Casino chips
- Cigar/smoke shops
- Coat check
- Disney Dollars
- Fisherman tokens
- Milk/dairy
- Parking tokens: for meters or gates
- Pay toilet tokens
- Peep show
- Railway cheque tokens

Medals

- Politicians, inventors and other notables, e.g. George Washington
- World's fairs or other expositions
- City or state anniversaries
- So-called dollars: medals and souvenirs similar in size to a silver dollar commemorating American historical events such as world's fairs, anniversary celebrations, dedications, battles, public works projects, etc.

Modern items under the exonumia umbrella include:

- Credit cards
- Gift cards
- Telephone cards
- Music cards

=== By region ===
==== China ====
There are many types of Chinese exonumia, including alternative currencies:

- Bamboo tally
- Token

and numismatic charms:

- Buddhist coin charm
- Burial money
- Confucian coin charm
- Horse coin
- Hell money
- Lei Ting curse charm
- Marriage coin charm
- Open-work charm
- Vault protector coin
- Taoist coin charm
- Zhengde Tongbao

==== Germany ====
Notgeld, primarily in the form of paper banknotes, was issued in Germany and Austria during World War I and the interwar period by towns, banks and other institutions due to a shortage of money.

==== Latin America ====
Latin American coffee or plantation tokens were an important part of commerce. Many plantation owners had their own commissaries and workers used plantation tokens to pay for provisions. Many tokens were made in the United States or Europe. Plantation tokens had an array of denominations and names. The name can be the owner, their relatives or the name of the farm (or finca). Tokens had allegorical symbols to identify the owner. Tokens were used as currency when there was not enough official currency available. Workers could convert the tokens to official currency on Saturdays.

Tokens were made in all types of base metals and alloys plus plastic, celluloid and bakelite. Unique to Costa Rica were tokens made of paper (paper chits). The word "boleto" is used in Costa Rica for the word token whereas "ficha" is used in the rest of Latin America.

==== United Kingdom ====
Conder tokens were privately minted tokens from the later part of the 18th century and the early part of the 19th century in England, Anglesey and Wales, Scotland, and Ireland.

==== United States ====
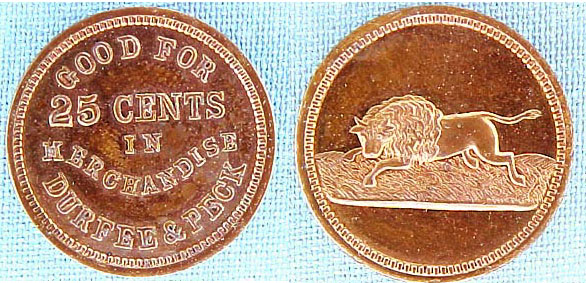
Copper trade token of Durfee & Peck, Indian traders on Missouri River in various locations, circa 1869

Rulau breaks down American tokens into these general time periods:

- Early American
- Hard times tokens were made during the "hard times" after President Andrew Jackson shut down the Second Bank of the United States. These tokens were issued privately to circulate in the local economy as a one cent coin. They had a wide variety of subject matter, including advertising and political/satirical themes (anti-slavery, anti-Jackson).
- Civil War tokens were made between 1861 and 1864 due to the scarcity of government-issued cents during the American Civil War. Encased postage stamps were also used for this purpose.
- Merchant (including modern gas tokens, ex: Shell tokens)
- Trade tokens
- Gay 90s

== See also ==
- Coin
- Currency
- Numismatics
- Token coins
- Scrip
- Paraphilately
- Phaleristics
