= Elongated coin =

Flattened, embossed coin used as a souvenir token

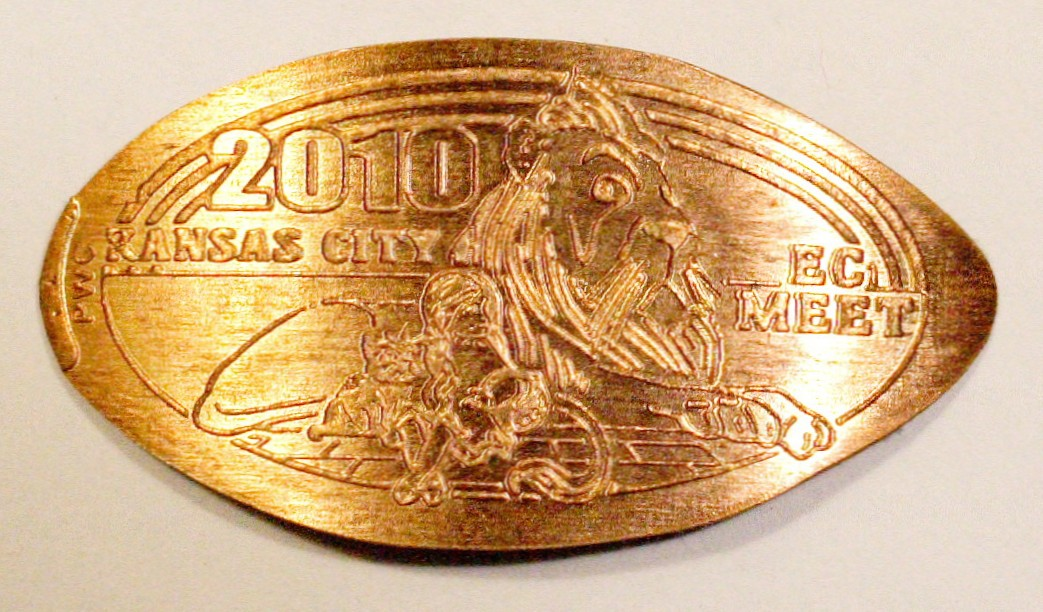
An elongated coin

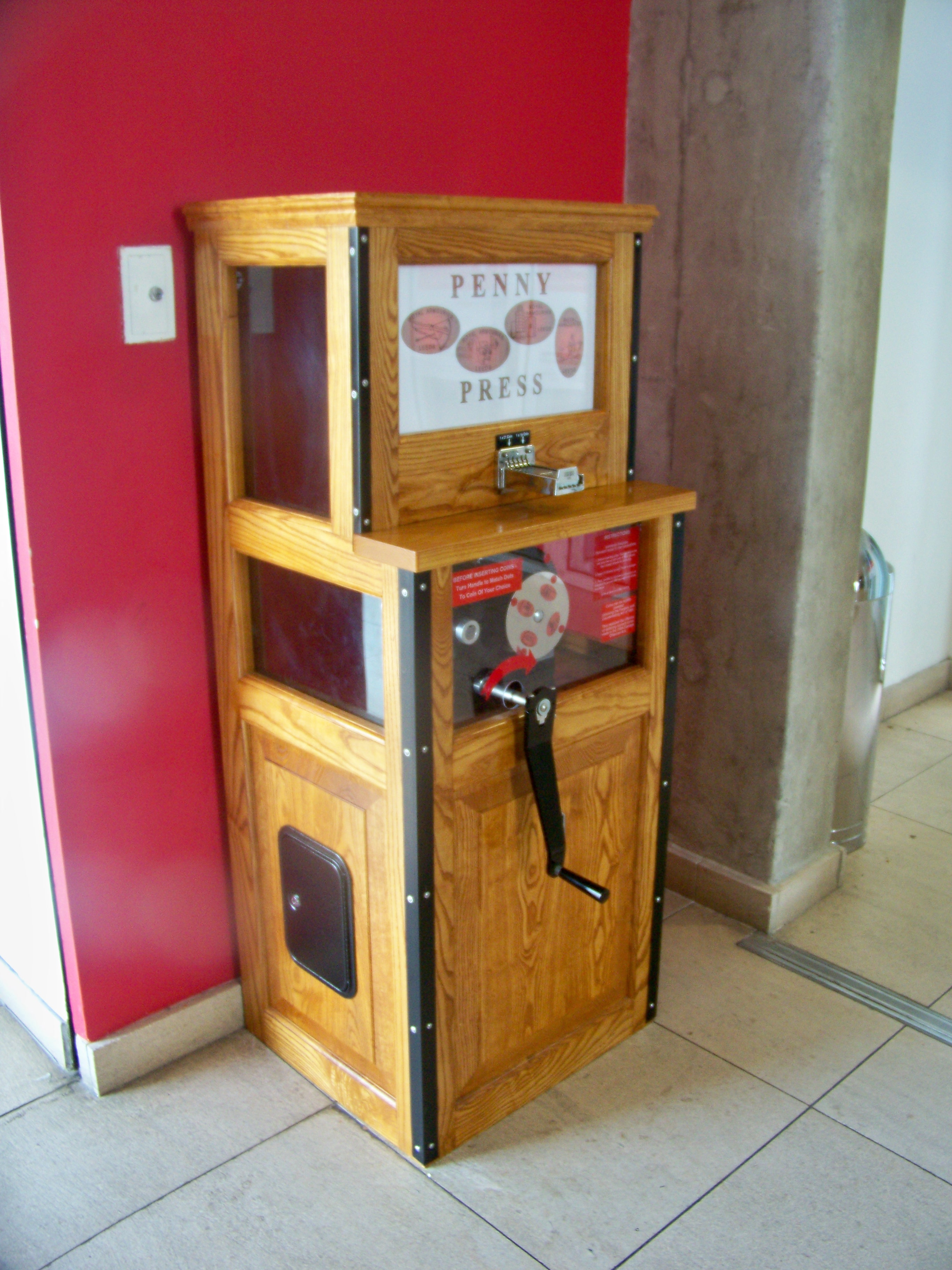
A 'penny press' at the Royal Armouries Museum in Leeds. This produces elongated coins from one new penny piece.

An elongated coin (also known as a pressed penny or smashed penny) is a coin that has been flattened or stretched, and embossed with a new design. Such coins are often used as commemorative or souvenir tokens, and it is common to find coin elongation machines in tourism hubs, such as museums, amusement parks, and natural or man-made landmarks.

The collecting of elongated coins is a branch of numismatics. Elongated coins are also categorized as exonumia.

== History ==
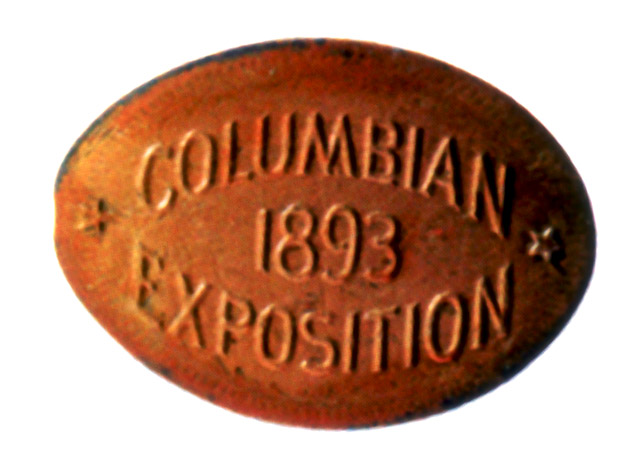
The first elongated coins were made by a die and metal rollers.

The first elongated coins in the United States were created at the World's Columbian Exposition, held in 1893 in Chicago, Illinois. Several designs were issued to commemorate the fair, and are available in the elongated coin collecting community today.

The earliest elongated coin designer on record is Charles Damm, who created the design for the elongated coins available at the 1901 Pan-American Exposition in Buffalo, New York.

The production of elongated coins can be divided into three general classes, each of which covers a distinct period from 1893 to the present. The first of the three classes are referred to colloquially as "oldies", and were produced mainly for issuance at nationwide fairs like the 1893 Chicago Columbian Exhibition and the 1904 St. Louis World's Fair. This period started with the issuance of the first elongateds in 1893, and ended with an influx of private rollers around 1965. The second class of elongated coins, the "Modern Elongateds", cover the years c. 1965 to c. 1985.

Around 1965, the major source of elongated coins became private rollers, individuals who designed and rolled elongated coins for sale. The major rollers of this period include Dottie Dow, the "House of Elongateds" (Lee Martin/Warren Bunge), Ralph Jones, Ralph W. Jobe, Elmer Anderson, Don Adams, Cee Ceven, and Angelo A. Rosato. While many private rollers still operate (notables include Raymond W. Dillard, Tyler D. Tyson, Brad Ream, and Don Adams), the vast introduction of commercial stand alone elongated machines came into the marketplace in 1988, following the introduction of the coin-operated penny press machine 1971, decreased the demand for private issues.

This event marks the beginning of the third class of elongated coins, the "Contemporary Elongateds" (c. 1988 – present). This class of elongated coin machines were designed and built by Randy and Earl Vaughn from Dayton, Ohio, in 1988. These mechanical coin-operated machines are still prominent in amusement parks such as Disney resorts and attractions throughout the United States, and the world.

The first known coin-operated stand-alone automated coin rolling vendor was designed by Vance Fowler and his Cimeter Group offering a "I Love Oregon" pressed penny which was placed in the Meier & Frank Company department store, a branch of The May Company Stores, in 1979. Vance Fowler's Cimeter Group also proposed the DN0001 prototype pressed coin as the first Disneyland Resort pressed coin in 1986. However, ultimately Centex Inc. was the first company to place a coin press machine at the Disneyland Resort, offering the DL0001 Mickey Mouse Rays pressed coin in 1987.

=== Collecting ===
The hobby of collecting elongated coins has expanded throughout the United States and the world. Most modern coin elongating machines can be found in museums or landmark gift shops, souvenir stores, zoos, amusement parks and other locations of this kind. Private engravers make special-issue elongated coins to commemorate historical events, personal landmarks (such as marriage or birth of a child), or other events warranting celebration. They also design elongated coins for private clubs and organizations.

Several websites and online groups exist to support collectors offering locations and articles covering topics such as rolling, preserving, cleaning, and other related topics. The Elongated Collectors is a non-profit organization that was founded in 1966. The group's official mission is to "educate, encourage and promote the study, acquisition and exhibition of elongated coins." The organization publishes a quarterly newsletter, "TEC News", and periodic email updates, "TEC eNews", creates elongated coins, and hosts an annual meeting in conjunction with the American Numismatic Association World's Fair of Money.

== Locales ==
It is common to find "pressed penny" machines in tourism hubs, such as museums, amusement parks, and natural or man-made landmarks.

== Process ==
An early and common method of coin elongation was smashing pennies by leaving them on a railroad track. When a train rolls over a penny, the force is sufficient to cause plastic deformation that flattens and stretches it into an oval, showing only the faintest trace of the original design. Some early railroad flattened cents were then hand engraved with the date and location.

Modern elongated coins are created by inserting a standard, small denomination coin into a small rolling mill consisting of two steel rollers pressed against each other with sufficient force to deform the coin. One of the rollers (called the "die") is engraved with a design that imprints a new image into the metal as the coin passes through it. The resulting coin is oval-shaped and shows a design corresponding to the design on the die in the mill. Some machines are hand operated, whereas others are fully automatic.

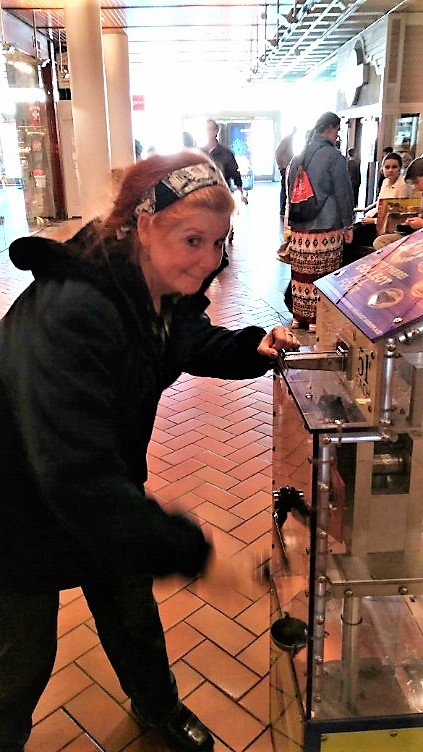
Using a common crank style penny squishing/elongation machine.

Throughout the history of the production of elongated coins, various methods have been used to engrave the design into the roller. Early elongateds were hand engraved with burin gravers, and some are still engraved using this method. More popular modern and contemporary methods include etching, pantograph engraving, and engraving using electric or air-powered rotary tools.

In the US, one-cent coins are most commonly used in these vending machines, as they are thin, easy to emboss, and are the smallest denomination of US money (most machines charge US$1.00 in addition to the cent rolled). All US cents produced after 1982 have a zinc core, and using them produces elongated coins with zinc streaks. This zinc streaking can be avoided by using coins produced before 1982. (The United States Mint produced both compositions during 1982.) Less common are machines that press designs into quarters, dimes, and nickels.

== Legality ==
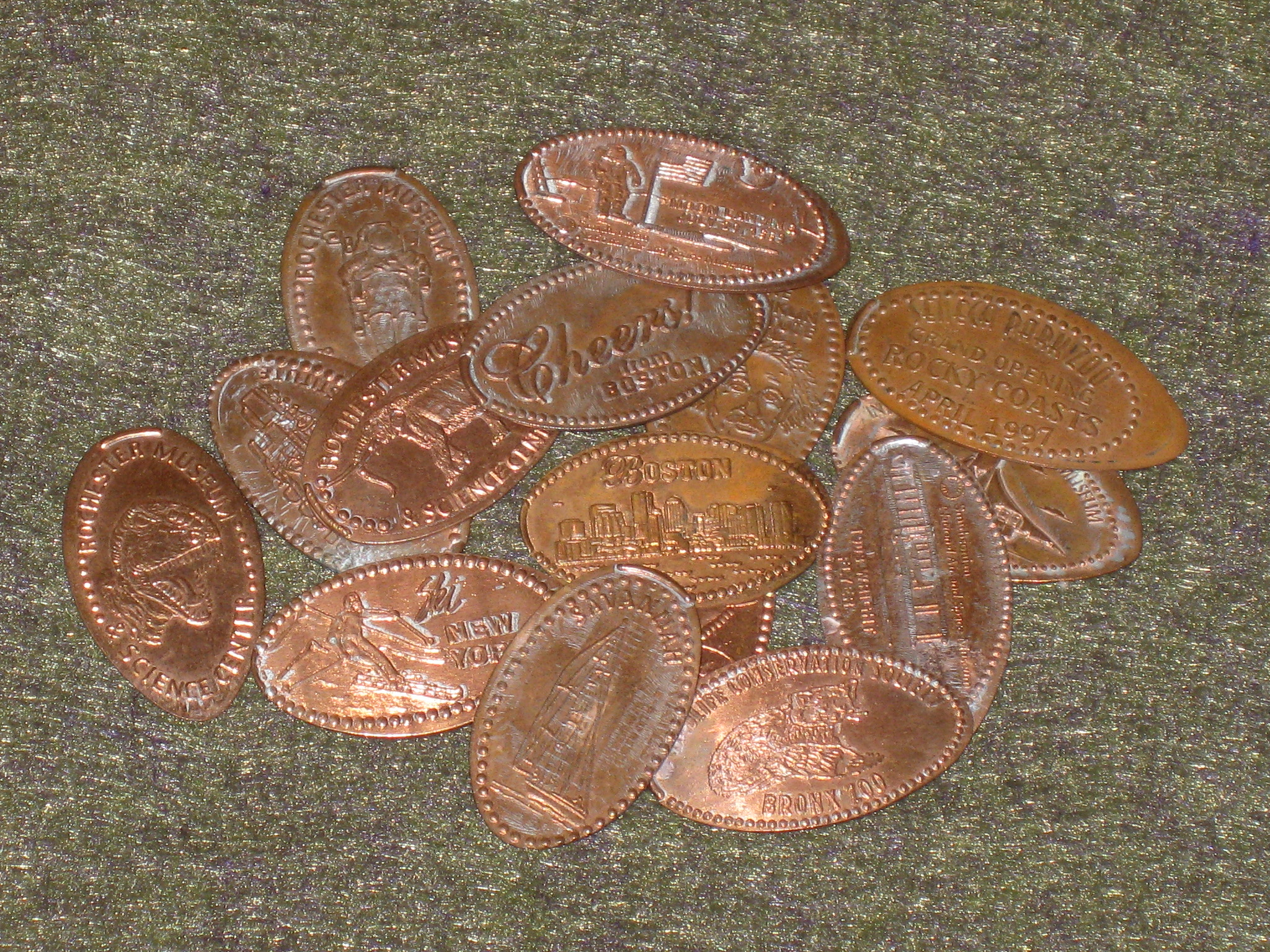
Collection of elongated pennies

The process of creating elongated coins is legal in the United States, South Africa and parts of Europe. In the United States, U.S. Code Title 18, Chapter 17, Section 331 prohibits "the mutilation, diminution and falsification of United States coinage." The foregoing statute, however, does not prohibit the mutilation of coins, if the mutilated coins are not used fraudulently, i.e., with the intention of creating counterfeit coinage or profiting from the base metal (the pre-1982 copper U.S. cent which, as of 2010, is worth more than one cent in the United States). Because elongated coins are made mainly as souvenirs, mutilation for this purpose is legal.

In the UK, the Coinage Act of 1971, Section 10 states: "No person shall, except under the authority of a licence granted by the Treasury, melt down or break up any metal coin which is for the time being current in the United Kingdom or which, having been current there, has at any time after 16th May 1969 ceased to be so." As the process of creating elongated coins does not require them to be melted nor broken up, Section 10 does not apply and coin elongation is legal within the UK with penny press machines a common sight at tourist attractions across the nation.

In countries where such mutilation is illegal, such as Canada, planchets, slugs, or U.S. cents are occasionally used, though this law is often ignored both by the users of the machine and law enforcement.

== See also ==
- Wooden nickel
