= Private currency in pre-revolutionary Russia =

In Russia, from the second half of the 19th to the early 20th century limited means of payment got rather widespread among private individuals - owners of commercial firms, shop owners, owners of profitable outlets at clubs. Sometimes the use of surrogate money resulted in a temporary shortage of state paper bills of small denominations and small coins in some region of the country. But most often the initiators of such unofficial emissions were the desire to get a more concrete economic benefit, for example, when bons that were paid instead of usual wage went then to purchase goods in a trade points organized by the same entrepreneurs.

All sorts of public organizations and clubs - class, national, professional, regimental-officer, charitable, hunting-sports and others - functioned actively, they had their buffets and canteens, organized some kind of activity. And in all the places listed, the surrogate local money of its own release was used, usually collectively referred to as "tokens." Often, the owners of some establishments gave surrogate money to their employees as a salary.

== Gaming Chips ==
In gaming clubs, the tokens served as a conditional bargaining unit and were used by individual citizens in private houses when playing cards and lotto as counting units for "betting against the bank." Playing chips were produced by famous (back then) firms, such as "L. Kh. LAYER" (Russian: Л.ХР.ЛАYЕРЪ), which produced in 1889 sets of chips of the same size in different metals with different denominations from 1 kopeck to 15 rubles.

== Tavern chips ==
Used in hotels, restaurants and similar institutions in the late 19th to early 20th century, the so-called "tavern chips" played primarily the role of accounting means: waiters made a preliminary internal calculation with the cashiers to receive money from customers.

The way of using these counting "chips" in restaurants is described in detail by A. Shishkin:

These stamps were used in all restaurant type institutions by waiters. They were intended for internal settlements between waiters, a buffet, and a kitchen. This was done so: at the start of the work the waiter received tokens of different denominations in the cash desk for a certain amount. He took them either to himself or bought for his/her own money (this was practiced in some restaurants). Passing the order of the visitor to the buffet and the kitchen, the waiter brought in the stamps for the required amount, and from the visitor received the money. At the end of the shift, the waiter handed into the cashier the remaining chips and money received from visitors (except for tips). In those institutions where the waiter was buying the tokens with his/her own cash, the cashier returned the money for the rest of the chips. From the buffet and the kitchen, the chips were returned to the cashier and the next day they were again given out to the waiter.

— A. Shishkin

Tavern chips were used by various consumer organizations, clubs, private hotels, restaurants, taverns and gambling houses, their manufacturers were producing chips on demand for private companies as well.

The most famous pre-revolutionary Moscow restaurateurs were represented by their own chips with short inscriptions such as "Yar" (Russian: Яръ), "Slavic Bazaar" (Russian: Славянскiй базаръ), "Prague S.T." (Russian: Прага С. Т.).

== Deposit chips ==
Special "deposit" metal bons were used with the designation of not only denominations, but also the names of items that came into temporary use, deposit, for the guests. The application of such additional inscriptions, specifying the type of service provided, is an invention of owners of Moscow's Metropol.

On the chips of the restaurant "Metropol" from the series named "Deposit" there was additionally added the room of the hotel - from "1" to "6". A separate group consists of coin-shaped tokens, often without specification of the denomination, with the name of those items used by the guests of the Metropol Hotel, served at the same time by the local restaurant.

== Church money ==
Among the numerous types of Russian metal tokens there are copies with the name of a church or a monastery and value in kopecks.

Chips with the names of churches represented a kind of church "trifle". They were given as change when buying candles and other accessories. At subsequent purchases of these items in the same church, chips were adopted as intra-church surrogates of small money. For some churches, paper bons of the same purpose are also known.

Chips with the names of monasteries had a somewhat different purpose. Monasteries served as a place of pilgrimage for believers, attracted here by various shrines, stored in these monasteries. Sometimes the number of pilgrims was quite significant, and a special influx of pilgrims was during the celebration of the saint whose relics were in the monastery.

For reception and temporary accommodation when arriving at the monasteries there were hotels and dining rooms. Meals in the refectory were served and those chips were used for internal calculations between the serving refectory staff (usually from among the monks), the kitchen and the buffet, the same as in restaurants tavern tokens were used by waiters.

== Bakery tokens ==
Tokens were often issued by the owners of bakeries. Used as a small change for regular customers, for bakers the release of their own tokens was an element of prestige. They put denominations and surnames on them, for example, five-kopeck denomination has the signature: "Bakery I.P. Berezina" (Russian: Булочная И. П. Березина), "Bakery Suslov" (Russian: Булочная Суслова), etc. Sometimes the denomination of the medal was indicated not in money terms, but in the weighted one: "GP LARIN 4 f HLBA." (Russian: Г П ЛАРИН 4 ф ХЛЪБА)

Well-known owners of bakeries and bakeries did not consider it necessary to specify on the stamps their baking activities, which their regular customers knew well. However, at the same time they were leaving their names and/or address on it.

== Bonds of private entrepreneurs ==
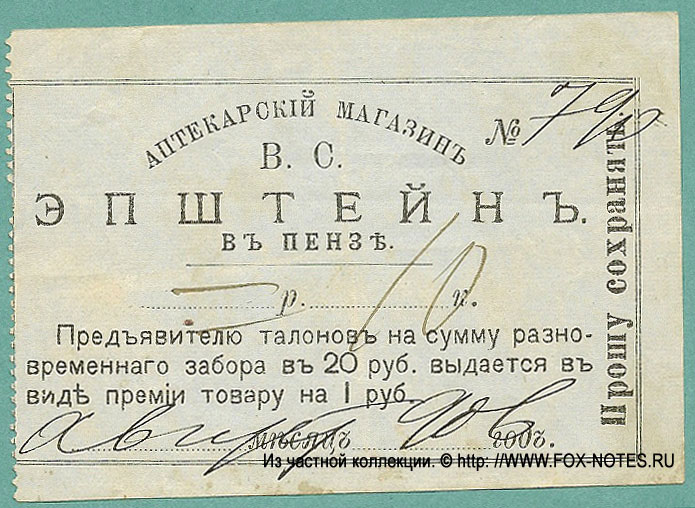
Pharmacy bon (1906)

The emission of private money in Russia was banned by law in 1870. At the same time, private bons, including metal ones, continued to be produced and received relatively wide distribution. So, for example, private money in the form of paper coupons were produced by the Urkach salt works.

Workers and employees received part of the earnings by similar bonuses and bought them in shops belonging to firms. The Siberian gold miner N.Bazilevsky, who in the second half of the 19th century released his own money on a 10-kopeck bons, wrote: "These stamps are issued instead of cash only by employees in our company and receive back from them also as cash for food and merchandise, taken from commercial stores or stocks. "

The struggle of the workers of the early twentieth century forced entrepreneurs to avoid issuing bons on their own behalf. Owners of factories began to organize at their enterprises various kinds of consumer societies and cooperative partnerships with a wide network of shops and shops, on behalf of which bons were issued.

The old Sormovo worker, M.I. Knyazev, recalling that time, wrote: "Until 1896, wages were only issued twice a year. Soon the order was changed, and the workers began to receive money every month. However, salary payments were systematically delayed. In such cases, the workers, without even realizing it, actually lent to the owners of factories a significant part of their wages without interest. Instead of money with workers, they paid stamps, so-called fofan (each costing 25-30 kopecks). On them you can take food and goods in a shop, which existed in Sormovo under the guise of the Consumer Organization. The Sormovo workers could also receive their products in private shops of Sormov (merchants Popov, Kotov, Tyutin) for fofan, with whom they had an agreement. "

=== Private banknotes of the late 18th century ===
On the release of Zorich's banknotes Tuchkov reports the following:

Zorich also started various factories in his estate, like silk fabrics, linen, sailing, rope, cloth and leather. But these institutions, apart from the loss, almost did not bring anything to him. Zorich, as it seems, has invented a means of making more debts. He even invented his bank notes. These were small printed pieces of a special kind, on which the price was set from 5 to 100 rubles, with a written price to pay from his estate. And when he had a need for money, he signed them and gave them out. In Shklov, they accepted them willingly. On his death, the arrangements were mainly paid by his banknotes, rather than with rubles, because on these papers there was not interest as on real bills, but they were used as government bonds.

— Tuchkov

Judging by the notes of Tuchkov, the time of release and circulation of these banknotes must be considered that period of Zorich's life, when in Shklow, after the death of Catherine the Great he was briefly summoned by Paul to military service, but soon fell into disgrace and was again returned to Shklov.

Thus, the beginning of the emission of these banknotes should be attributed to the last years of the 18th century. They were destroyed in 1800, with the death of Zorich.

History has not retained to us any of Zorich's banknotes, but on the basis of Tuchkov's description we have the right to recognize that these were not ordinary or promissory notes of the usual type, but rather what is commonly understood by "banknotes", as they are called by their contemporary - Tuchkov.

=== «Maltsovka» ===
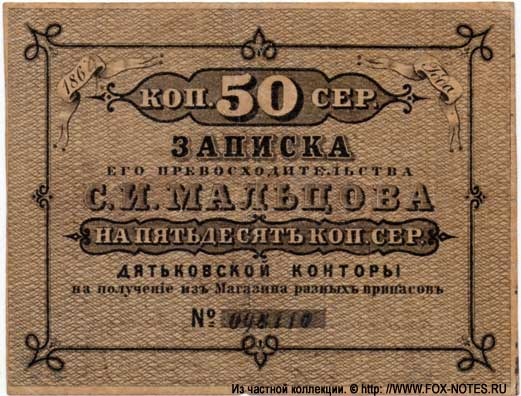
Example of Maltsov banknote of 50 kopeck produced in 1744

Malt'sov was a russian industrialist, who created his own Maltsovsky factory district, covering an area of about 215,000 hectares, was located along the Bolva River, the tributary of the Desna and the Zhizdre River, to the Oka tributary on the lands of adjacent districts of the Oryol province (which included the then Bryansk), Kaluga and Smolensk provinces. In general, the industry of a multi-populated district was a conglomerate of a wide variety of enterprises - iron foundries and machine-building plants, glass, crystal and faience, paper-making and even distilleries, breweries and honeymakers, not to mention small subsidiary enterprises. During the heyday of the Maltsov industrial district, there were more than 20 large factories alone. Maltsov factories gave earnings to almost one hundred thousand people, counting not only the indigenous population, but also the surrounding peasantry, which was hired for side work in factories - for the transportation of ore, fuel, coal, for forest work, and so on.

In the possession of Maltsov during their heyday, practically, a self-sufficient economic zone was created, which provided for itself with all necessary. From the outside, only some products, tea, manufactured goods and so-called "colonial" goods were purchased.

One of the most notable phenomena in the economic life of the Maltsov possessions was the issue of own money surrogates - coupons with a face value of 3 kopecks to 5 rubles, and it was connected, most likely, with the crisis of the monetary system that broke out in Russia at the turn of the fifties the sixties. The difficult situation was further exacerbated by the lack of circulation of a small coin. With a decrease in the value of the ruble and the termination of the exchange, the silver coin began to disappear from circulation, as it was profitable to remelt it into products and sell it abroad. Even a small coin disappeared from circulation, settling on the hands of the population, trying to hedge against possible financial losses.

In the early 1860s Maltsov's "notes" were not only readily accepted by neighboring landlords as a quitrent, but also when paying various state taxes. Maltsov "notes" cease to be simply coupons for getting products from factory warehouses, prepared for future use by the plant management. They become a means of circulation in the trade of neighboring counties. Mentioned "money paper signs, circulated on local markets on a par with government money" and in an essay by N. Sakharov, dedicated to memories of the Kaluga governor.

Now not only the workers of the Maltsovsky district use "general money" - the trade of the adjacent counties of the three Russian provinces willingly uses them in circulation. Maltsov's "banknotes", being a highly liquid means of payment, become, in a sense, a kind of money, a stable means of circulation admitted by the government.

By the law of November 23, 1870 new issues of notes are terminated - additional government orders are issued that toughen control over the unauthorized emissions of money surrogates. Of the total mass of notes issued for the amount (according to various sources) of 2.5-3 million rubles, by the time the issue was banned, it remained uncalled for about 1 million rubles. Subsequently, the Maltsov Industrial and Trade Association spent an additional 700 thousand rubles to cover the demands for payment.

== Sebryakov's bons - the first "Time Bank" ==
In 1870, a law was promulgated that prohibited the use of any private money, the law had in mind such cases as "Maltsovka". However, they had denomination in rubles or kopecks, in contrast to the bonds of Sebryakov.

Under the socage economy system, the serf peasant worked part of the week for his land allotment, and worked for the rest of the week on the landowner in his estate, thus practicing the land allocated to him by the landowner. Socage is a free forced labor of a serf peasant in the landowner's household, a typically Russian form of labor in the second half of the 18th century. According to the law of 1797 on a three-day corvee, the peasant family had to work on their horse for the landowner three days a week. Moreover, one day a week the wife, daughter or mother of a serf had to work.

To account for days worked in the estate of M. V. Sebryakov four types of chips were used, printed on a solid white half-board with a black paint, without the date of release:

1. Walking male working day - a rectangular shape, measuring 47.5x22.5 mm.

2. Female working day - in the form of a circle with a diameter of 32 mm.

3. Children's work day - a triangular shape

4. Equestrian work day.

In the conditions of closed rural life such bonuses could become limited local payment value, because they were followed by a certain measure of labor.

"Day labor bons", put into circulation in the estate of Sebryakov, served not only to take into account the days worked at the corvee. The earned and accumulated in excess of the prescribed norm, they were an economic stimulus to work, served as a yardstick of labor.

It is probable that the worker could sell or exchange the extra "day labor bons" with an equal peasant - thus, we see how free and forced labor became a commodity.

== Bons and Tokens of Consumer Organization ==
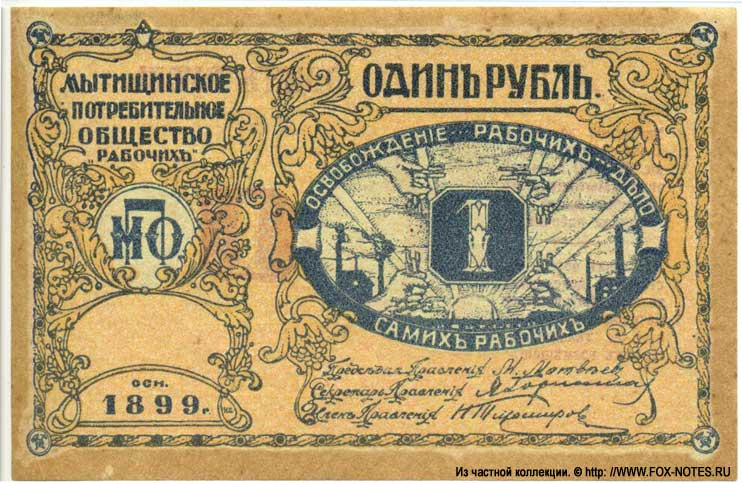
1 ruble produced by Mytishchi consumer organization of workers

In Russia, consumer organizations emerged after the abolition of serfdom. The first was Riga, whose articles of association was approved in 1865. In 1901, 577 companies were registered, and by 1917 there were 23 thousand of them, comprising 6.8 million shareholders. Most of Russian consumer organizations worked by the "discount" model, meaning they were making an agreement with the entrepreneurs for selling their good to the shareholders of consumer organizations for a lower price. The board of the company produced special paper or metal tokens of different denominations, which supplied its members. This accounted for the amount of purchases goods of each shareholder.

== Urban Water Pipes Tokens ==
Construction of water pipes in Russian cities in the late 19th and early 20th centuries caused the appearance of special coupons or tokens for the right to receive water from the water booths.

Paper coupons were more often used, but some cities also produced metal tokens.

Such water tokens are known to be produced in Tula, Volgograd, Voronezh, Krasnoyarsk, Novocherkassk, Orenburg, Perm, Sverdlovsk, Chelyabinsk, Yaroslavl.

The water pipes in Voronezh appeared in 1869, thanks to the merchant Stepan Kryazhov. Pipes and equipment were brought from England and led by English specialists. The first water pump provided water only for 2 central streets of the city. The water supply supplied the citizens with 100 thousand buckets of water per day. It was taken by water carriers from the water-collecting basins and was transported to the population of districts without water supply. The city duma determined annual water standards: for one inhabitant - 271 buckets, for a cow - 804, for a horse - 1358 buckets.

== Municipal Tokens ==
Instead of water pipes tokens with values in volumes of water, city councils, in case the water supply network belonged to the city, issued their own "municipal" bons and tokens. With them it was possible to purchase services and goods produced by the government, and in the first place, its water supply.
