= Banknotes of the Sungei Buloh Settlement =

The banknotes of the Sungei Buloh Settlement were issued as leprosy colony money in 1935 and 1936, at Sungai Buloh, Selangor, British Malaya when it was a leper colony. The currency (near money, actually scrip or vouchers) was pegged to the Straits Settlements dollar. These notes are extremely scarce. They were all printed by the Survey Department, Federated Malay States. They have never been listed in the Standard Catalog of World Paper Money.

The 1936 issue are all inscribed 'SUNGEI BULOH SETTLEMENT VALID FOR GOODS WORTH (x denomination) WITHIN THE SUNGEI BULOH SETTLEMENT ONLY' in English, Chinese, Arabic, and Tamil.

== First issue (1935) ==
This issue consisted of a single denomination— a 5-cents banknote bearing the date 4 February 1935. It is printed on only one side in English, Chinese, and Tamil.

- SPB1. 5 cents. Black on white (115 x 83 mm)

== Second issue (1936) ==
These notes depict a kingfisher sitting on a rock with the Sun rising in the background. They are printed on both sides. The 5-cent and 10-cent notes have a border pattern on the back with the numbers '5' and '10' at both ends, respectively. The $1 has a water buffalo-drawn cart on the back with the number '1' in a border pattern at both ends of the note.

- SPB2. 5 cents. Red. (120 x 63 mm)
- SPB3. 10 cents. Blue. (120 x 63 mm)
- SPB4. 1 dollar. Purple. (120 x 80 mm)

== Destruction ==
The Director, Dr. Gordon Alexander Ryrie, sent the special notes for examination and it was proved that the notes were not disease carriers. All special notes were burned in a bonfire in 1938.
