= Promotional fake United States currency =

Faux currency that is clearly inauthentic

Promotional fake United States currency is fantasy "currency", adapted from United States currency that makes no assertion of being legal tender and is often created by individuals as a way to promote practical jokes, or social statements. It is legal to print so long as it makes no assertion, whether by appearance or statement, of authenticity. Promotional United States fake currency is not to be confused with counterfeit currency or conflated with legitimate currency that has been demonetized.

== History ==
In the 1970s, copper coins known as Nixon pennies were made about one-quarter the size of a regular U.S. cent and depicted President Richard M. Nixon on the obverse. The reverse showed the Watergate Hotel. They were issued as novelty items and as political commentary on inflation that occurred under President Nixon. Other types of coins have been similarly miniaturized before and since as souvenirs or collector's items. Though a gold three-dollar coin was produced in the 1800s, and the Bahamian dollar (which is pegged to the US dollar) has a $3 banknote, no three-dollar bill has ever been produced in the United States. Various fake US$3 bills have also been released over time. These generally poke fun at politicians or celebrities such as Richard Nixon, Michael Jackson, George W. Bush, both Bill and Hillary Clinton, and Barack Obama in reference to the idiomatic expression "queer as a three-dollar bill" or "phony as a three-dollar bill". In the 1960s, Mad printed a $3 bill that featured a portrait of Alfred E. Neuman and read: "This is not legal tender—nor will a tenderizer help it." Mad writer Frank Jacobs said that the magazine ran afoul of the US Secret Service because the $3 bill was accepted by change machines at casinos.

The United States has never issued a million dollar bill. However, many businesses print million dollar bills for sale as novelties. Such bills do not assert that they are legal tender. The Secret Service has declared them legal to print or own and does not consider them counterfeit. The Libertarian Party makes an annual tradition of handing out informational fliers made to look like $1,000,000 bills on April 15 to draw attention to its anti-income tax platform. A notable example of a 7-figure bill is currency from The Mad Magazine Game which features a $1,329,063 bill that serves as an Old Maid in the game. Players compete in this game to lose all their money. The bill features a portrait of Alfred E. Neuman.

== See also ==
- Angus Bucks
- Disney Dollars, corporate scrip issued by the Walt Disney Company for use at its theme parks that bears a close resemblance to US banknotes
- Exonumia
- Hell money
- Monopoly money
- Three dollar bill (disambiguation)
- Wooden nickel
- Zero-euro notes
