= Bakery token =

Exonumia used by bakeries

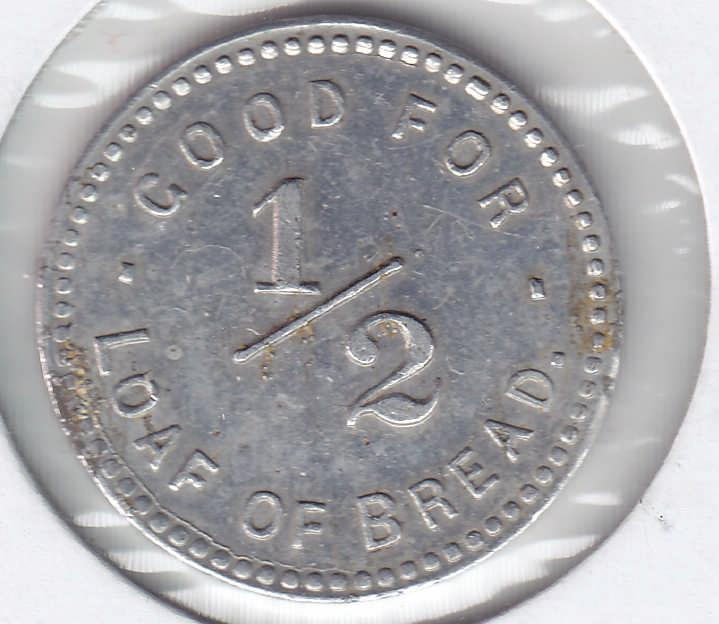
Bakery token from Deseronto, Ontario

A bakery token is a form of commercial token sold by and used in bakeries in the United States and postconfederation Canada primarily in the late 19th and early 20th century. The tokens, usually made of brass, copper or aluminum, were given in lieu of change as a way of encouraging customers to return to the store. They were also given to suppliers in smaller locations as partial payments. They came in denominations of 1/2, 1, and 2 loaf.

These tokens are similar to those used in pre-Revolutionary Russia as well as the méreau used in France during late the Middle Ages and Reformation.
