= Fantasy issue =

Unofficial issue that is not legal tender

A fantasy issue is an unofficial issue that appears to be money (coin or paper note) but is privately made and is not legal tender nor intended for payment. It is also not considered counterfeit as it does not attempt to replicate actual currency. Fantasy (or novelty) issues can be made to honor a person or event, for advertising purposes, for humor, for artistic purposes, or to show how a note might have looked had it been actually issued. Fantasy issues from the United States are popular, featuring, for example, celebrities or non-standard denominations. In Britain, such fantasy or satirical paper issues are known as skit notes. They may also be made for the purposes of political propaganda.

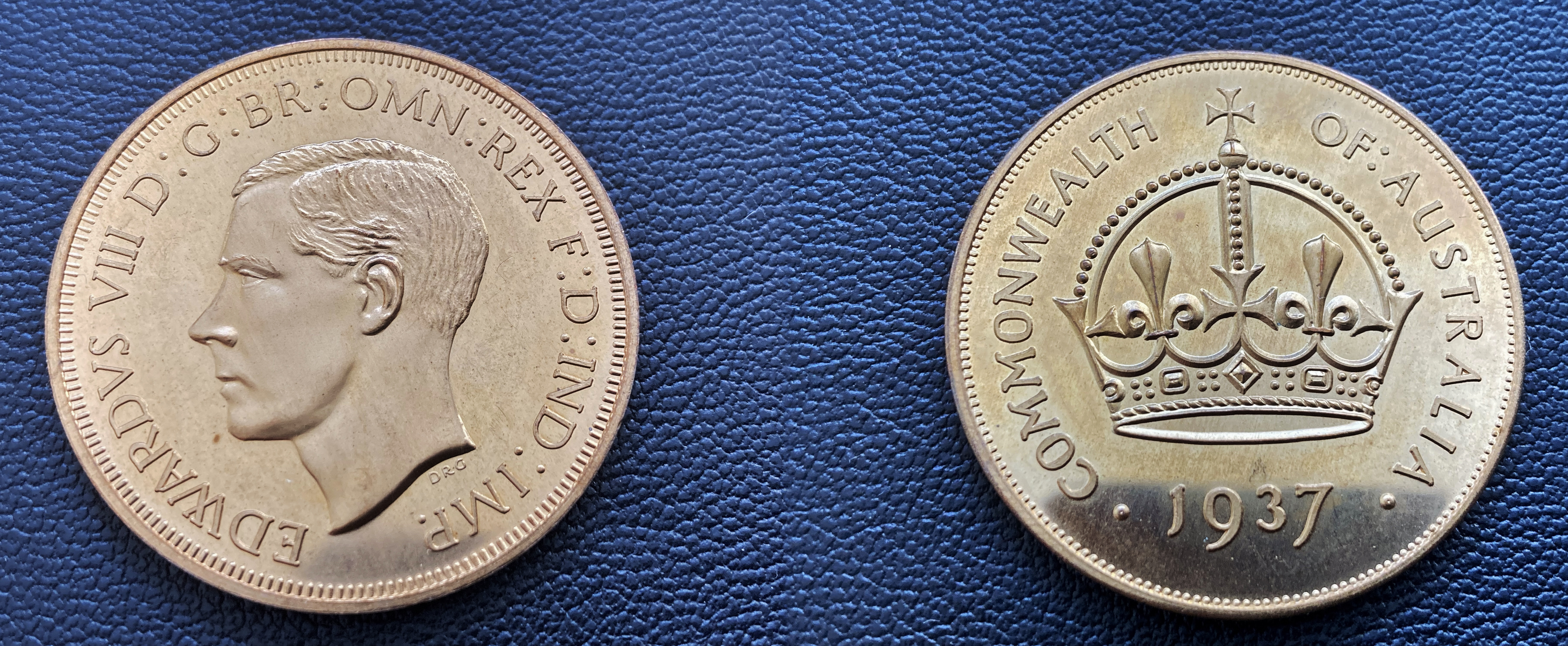
Fantasy coin depicting Edward VIII. His abdication meant that only a small number of actual Edward VIII coins exist.

== Propaganda ==
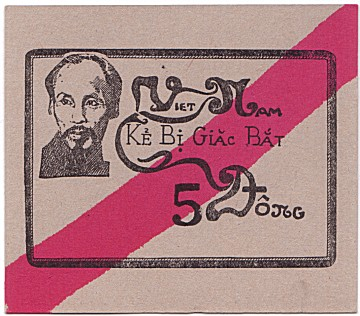
Fantasy note dating from the First Indochina War depicting Ho Chi Minh.

Fantasy issues are often made by separatist or similar political movements. A large amount of money of this kind was made in Yugoslavia. Prior to the breakup of Yugoslavia, fantasy issues appeared in every federal unit of Yugoslavia, except Vojvodina. Some of the issues, like Slovenian lipa were used as semi-official tender in parallel with the Yugoslav dinar, its first edition being 1 lipa dated to November 11 1989. A fantasy issue printed in Serbia for "Serbia and the United Serbian Republics" was the srbijanka, printed in Užice using the same printing works as the perper for Montenegro.

Other Yugoslavian issues were made in the late 40's and early 50's, known as the "Informburo series", produced in Germany by Manfred Dietl.

Fantasy notes were produced in Europe purporting to be for the use of prisoners of war captured by the Viet Minh during the First Indochina War.

== See also ==
- Exonumia
- Bryan Money
- Money Art
- Zero-rupee note
