= Russell Rulau =

American numismatic

- Russell Rulau
- Born: September 21, 1926; Chicago, Illinois, U.S.
- Died: November 12, 2012 (aged 86); Iola, Wisconsin, U.S.
- Occupations: Numismatist, author
- Years active: 1962-2012

Russell Alphonse Rulau (September 21, 1926 – November 12, 2012) was an American numismatist. He was involved in coin collecting for over 60 years. From his earliest days as a casual collector, Rulau contributed to numismatics as a writer, editor and club organizer. His interest in world coins led him to create the "Coin of the Year" award. The award is presented annually by Krause Publications' World Coin News. Rulau coined the term "exonumia" in 1960.

== Literary career ==
While working for Amos Press, Rulau edited publications such as Coin World and Numismatic Scrapbook. He was also responsible for creating World Coins Magazine.

He later worked for Krause Publications and contributed to the editing of the World Coin News and Bank Note Reporter. He has also written several numismatic books, including How to Order Foreign Coins, Modern World Mint Marks, World Mint Marks, Hard Times Tokens, Early American Tokens, U.S. Merchant Tokens 1845-1860, U.S. Trade Tokens 1866-1889, Tokens of the Gay Nineties and Latin American Tokens. From 1985 to 1988, he also served as the North American representative for the Pobjoy Mint.

== Numismatic honors ==
In addition to the American Numismatic Association, Rulau was a member of various other numismatic groups. These include the American Numismatic Society, Royal Numismatic Society, the Royal Canadian Numismatic Association. He was a founding member of the Token and Medal Society in 1960.

He is also a recipient of the Numismatic Literary Guild's coveted Clemy Award, and several awards from the American Numismatic Association. These awards include the Glenn Smedley Memorial Award, Lifetime Achievement Award and Medal of Merit.

== Personal life ==
Rulau married Prudence June Meister in 1948 and had two children, Russell and Marsha, before they divorced. He later married Hazel Darlene Grizzell on February 1, 1968, and they remained married until her death in 2008.
