= Three dollar bill =

Three dollar bill or three-dollar bill may refer to:

- Bahamian dollar, which has a three-dollar banknote
- Promotional fake United States currency
- 3 Dollar Bill, a bar in Brooklyn, New York

== See also ==
- Three-dollar piece, a gold coin made in the United States from 1854 to 1889
- Three Dollar Bill, Y'all, an album by Limp Bizkit
- The dictionary definition of queer as a three-dollar bill at Wiktionary
- The dictionary definition of phony as a three-dollar bill at Wiktionary
