= Pub token =

Form of token coin used in drinking establishments

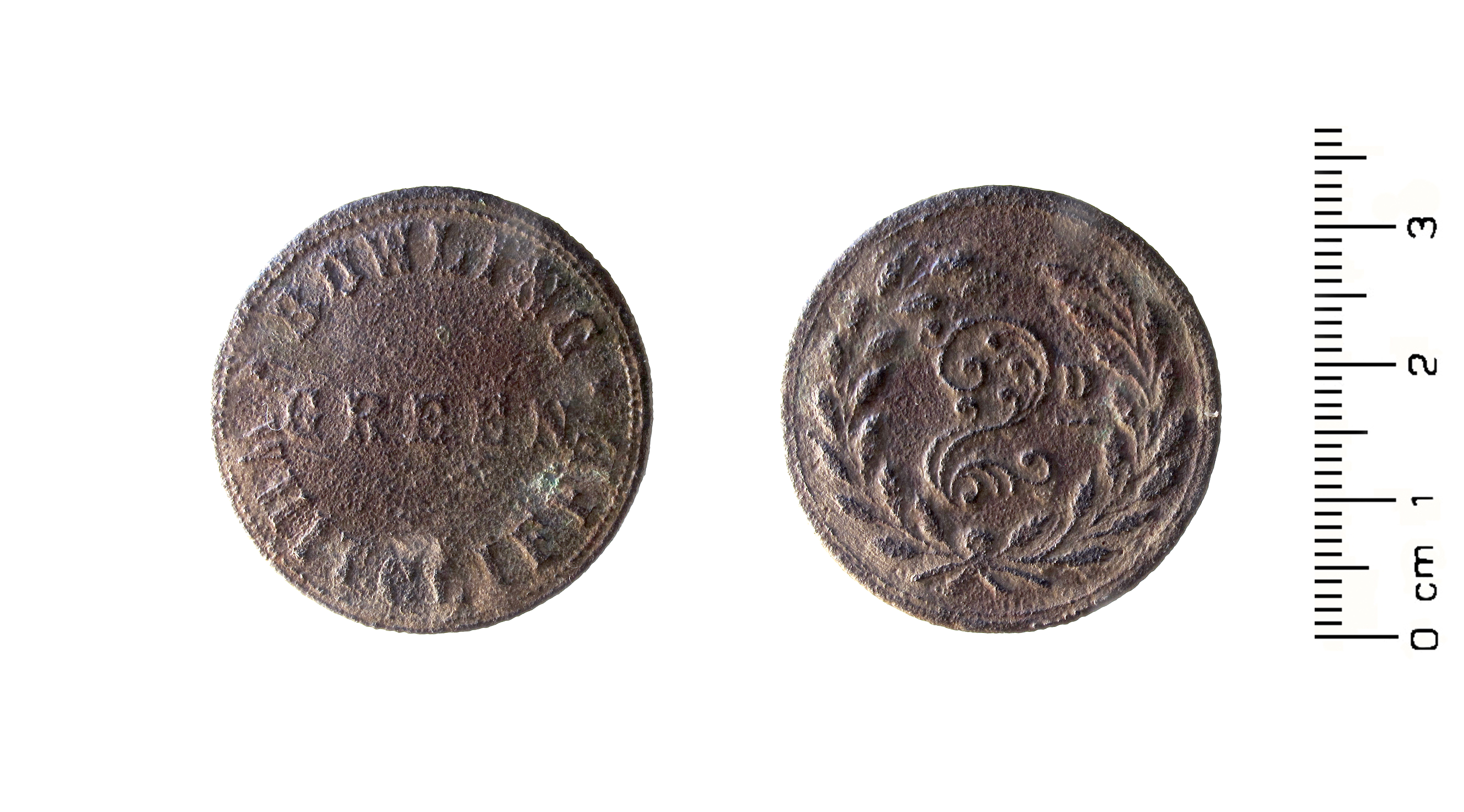
Twopence token from the Bowling Green Inn, Whitcliffe, 19th century

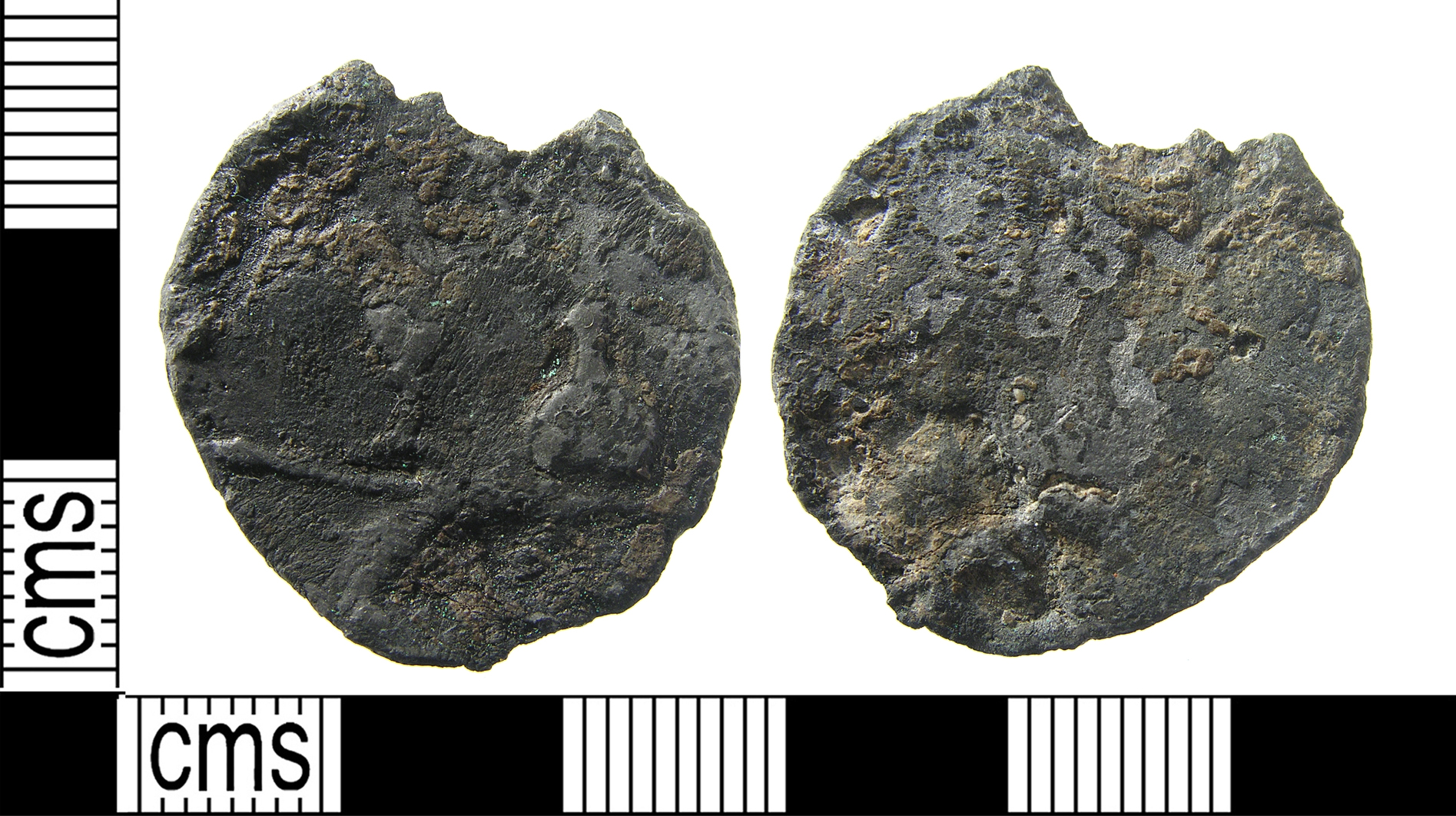
Lead alloy tavern token showing a wine bottle and glass (c. 1670–1800)

Pub tokens or tavern tokens (as they are known in Great Britain and Ireland) or bar tokens or chits (United States usage) are a form of exonumia used in drinking establishments.

== Usage ==
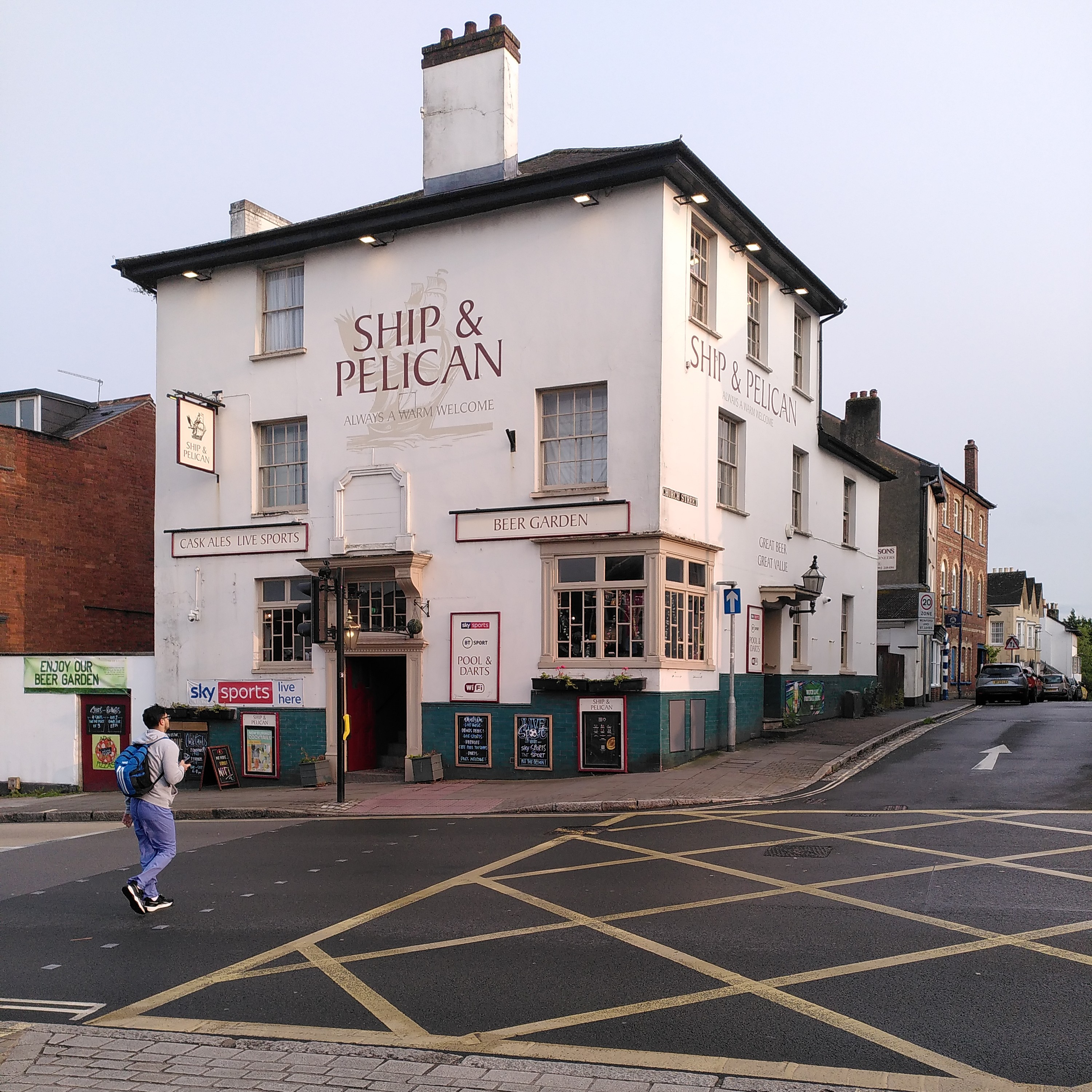
The Ship and Pelican public house, Exeter, issued 1½d copper tokens from 1890 when it was part of Algar and Crowson's Windsor Brewery Group.

In Great Britain, Ireland and the US, during the 17th to 20th centuries, public houses sometimes issued tokens which could be used in payment for future drinks. These tokens were sometimes used in small, family bars where patrons knew each other. They were also used in saloons and hotel bars. When buying a round of drinks for friends, the bartender would give a token to those patrons already having a drink, and collect the full sum from the round-buyer. The owner would collect immediately, and the drinkers would have a token for later use. As the token cost less to produce than the value of the drink, there was a significant profit to the bar owner. Sometimes, drinkers would take the token home, and forget to bring them back. This has been cited as the reason bar owners loved tokens, and they were found in virtually every drinking establishment.

Tokens were also used as change, where the price of the drink was odd. For example, in America for many years, drinks were two for 25 cents, or one bit (12.5 cents) each. Thus tokens exist with one-bit denominations.

The early tokens were usually made of brass or aluminum and would have the name or initials of the pub on them, so that they could not be used anywhere else. Often, they had the landlord's name on them as well. This ensured that, when the pub changed hands, the new landlord would not have to honor old tokens. Many small, family bars still use tokens today, but modern tokens are generally made of plastic (brass and aluminum tokens are still made, but as they are more expensive, are less used). Many tokens only had names or initials, and are known as mavericks, as their location is often unknown. Token researchers spend many hours attempting to identify maverick tokens to a specific location, as attributed tokens are therefore desired by collectors of that town. Unidentified maverick tokens are worth minimal sums, where some identified tokens can be worth up to hundreds of dollars.

Books on pub or bar tokens are generally by country or state. Not all states have been researched, and some state catalogs are out of print.

== See also ==
- List of public house topics
- Exonumia
- Token coin
- Voucher
