= Railway pay cheque =

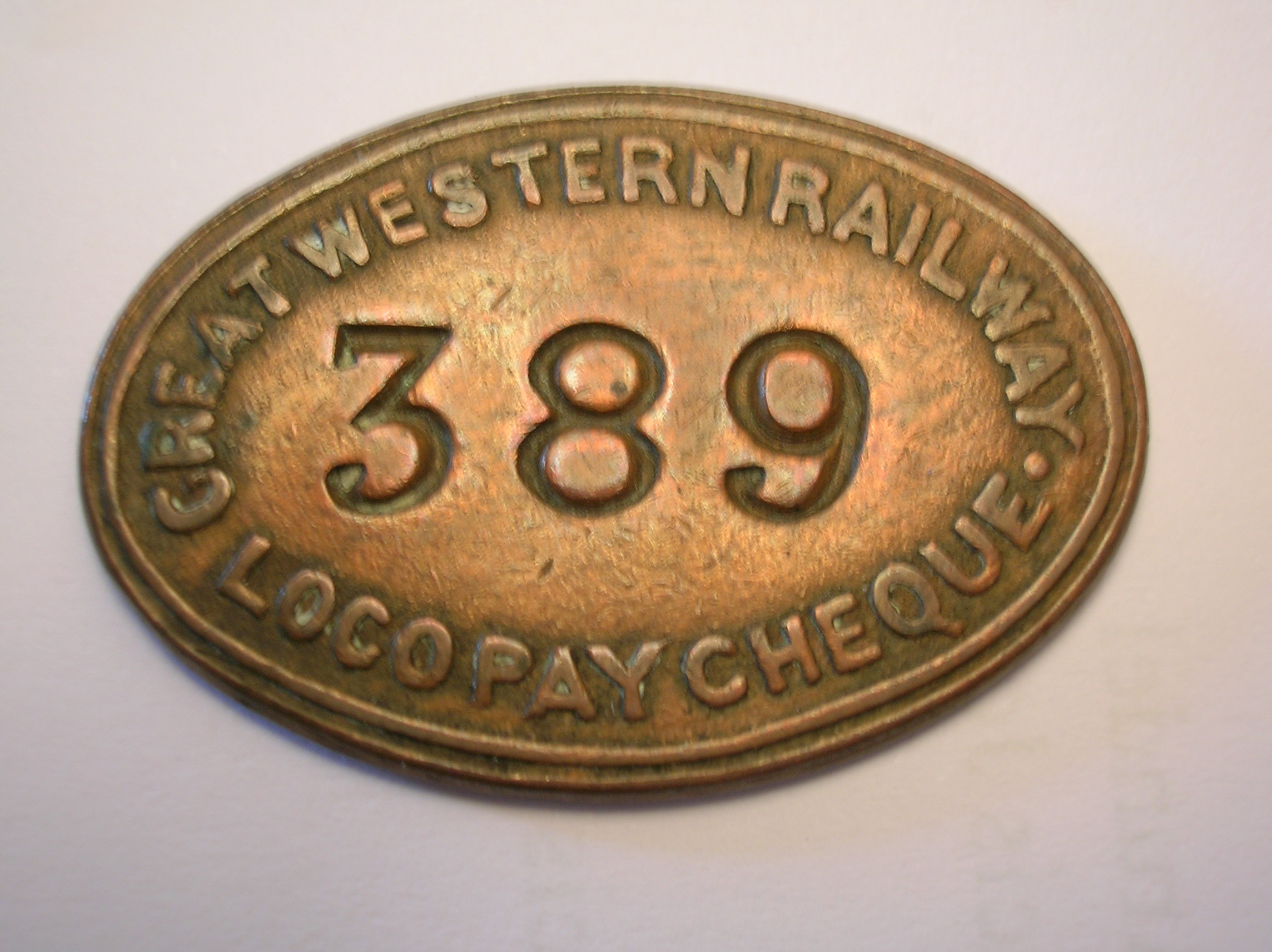
A Great Western Railway Loco Pay Cheque used by a Locomotive Department employee (driver, fireman, engine cleaner etc.)

Railway pay cheques were metallic tokens or tallies used to ensure appropriate payment to the correctly identified railway employee.

== Usage ==
The one-sided identification cheques were usually drawn from the wages office on a Thursday, prior to the Friday payday. The cheques would then be exchanged for a payslip, and the wages paid on signature. In many cases where pay cheques were in use they were often issued to each employee at the start of his employment and retained for the rest of the person's working life with the company. Specialised trays were used for storing these cheques. Stores, maintenance and other departments used this 'pay cheque' system. British Railways examples exist, however it is not at present recorded when their use ceased.

Other occupations used the pay cheque system, such as the mining industry.

=== Pay checks and checks or tallies ===
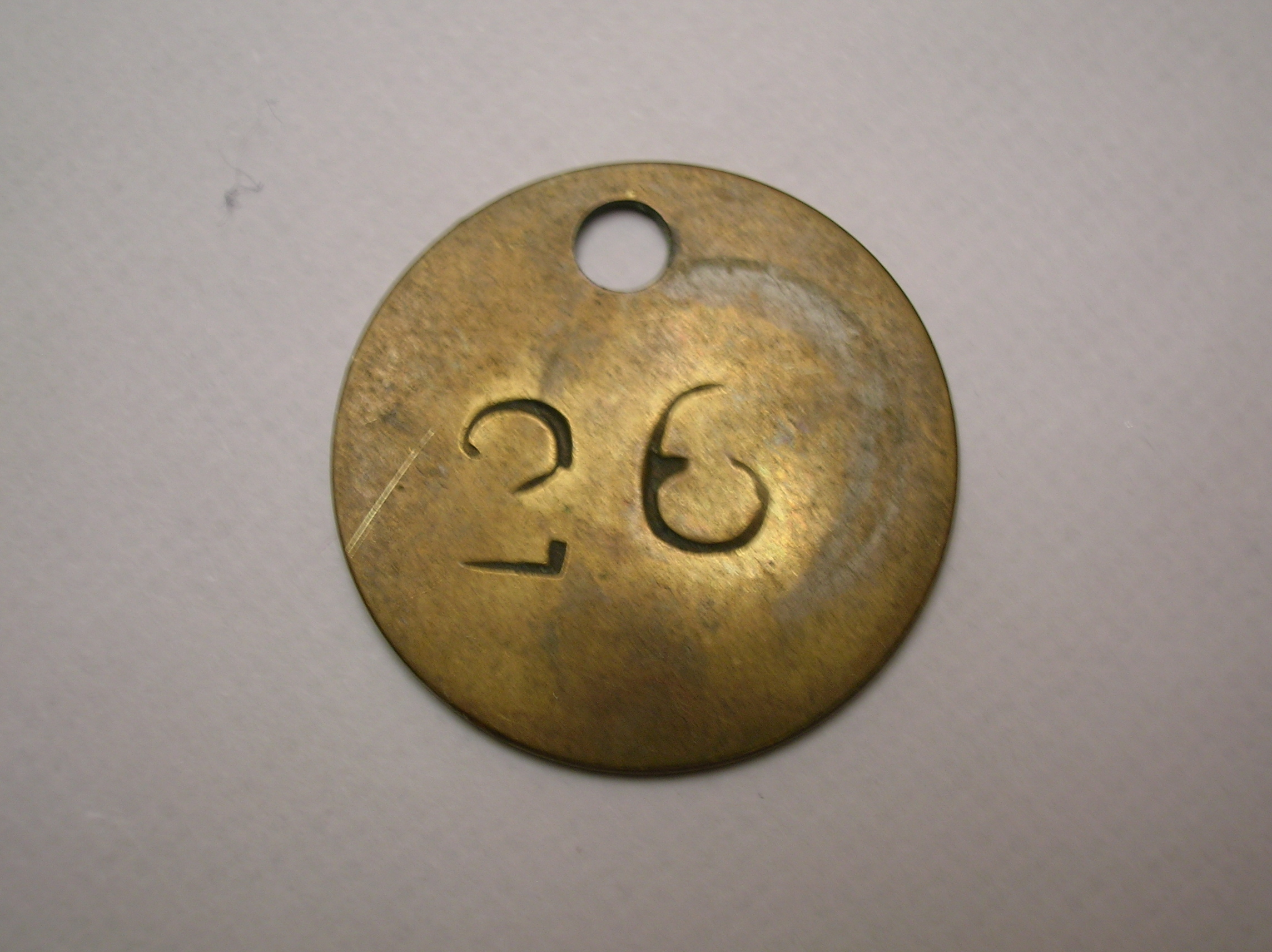
A tally piece or pay cheque.

These had a slightly different use, being more of a system for ensuring the correct pay by 'checking' in and out of the workplace prior to machines being produced for this specific purpose. 'Checks' were often 'holed' for hanging on boards. In mining, for example, a number on the check was personal to each miner and prior to going down the pit, the miner would give one of his tallies to the pit head "banksman", keeping the duplicate for the duration of the shift. Upon returning to the surface, the miner gave his personal tally to the banksman who would pass it on to the time office or the lamp room. This system made it possible to keep track on workers' whereabouts in the mine complex and for what periods they were working.

Pay checks and tallies were only marked on one side and were produced in a great variety of shapes, sizes and designs; made typically of brass or zinc, sometimes steel or aluminium.

== Pay cheque types ==
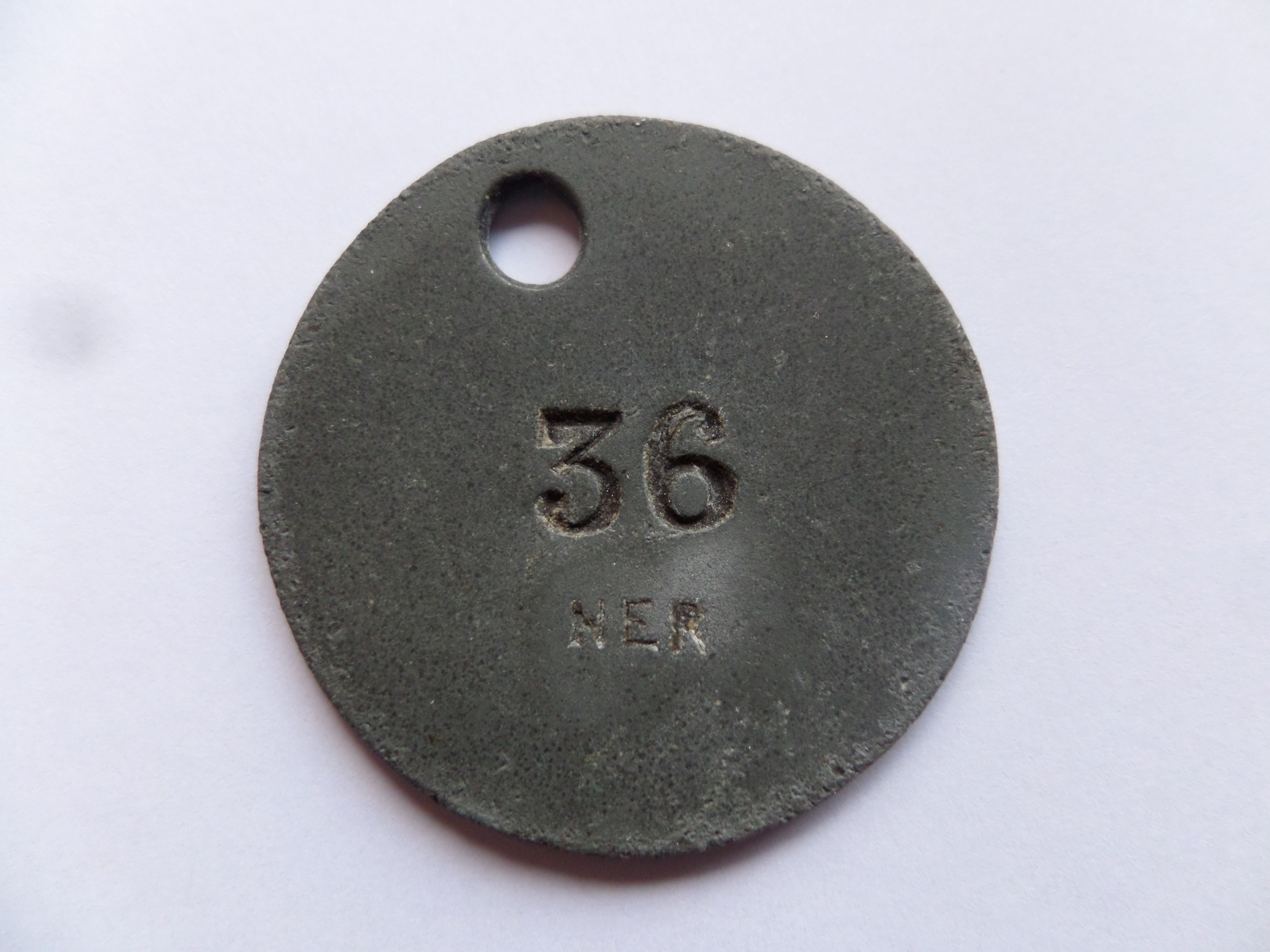
NER Pay Cheque of tin or zinc

=== Shapes ===
Pay cheques came in various shapes and sizes, including oval, circular, square, tear-shaped, D-shaped, bone-shaped, rectangular, octangular,

=== Composition ===
Copper, brass, white metal and pewter were in common use.

=== Issuing railway companies ===
Pay cheques were issued by a number of companies, including the Great Western Railway, London, Midland and Scottish Railway, London & North Western Railway, British Railways, Great Central Railway, North Eastern Railway, etc.

== Exonumia ==
Railway cheques are collected as exonumia or paranumismatica.
