= John Gault =

American inventor

John Gault was an American entrepreneur and inventor who created the encased postage stamp. Gault used these encased postage stamps as a means to solve a coin shortage during the Civil War as well as ultimately profit from their sale.

== Encased postage stamp ==
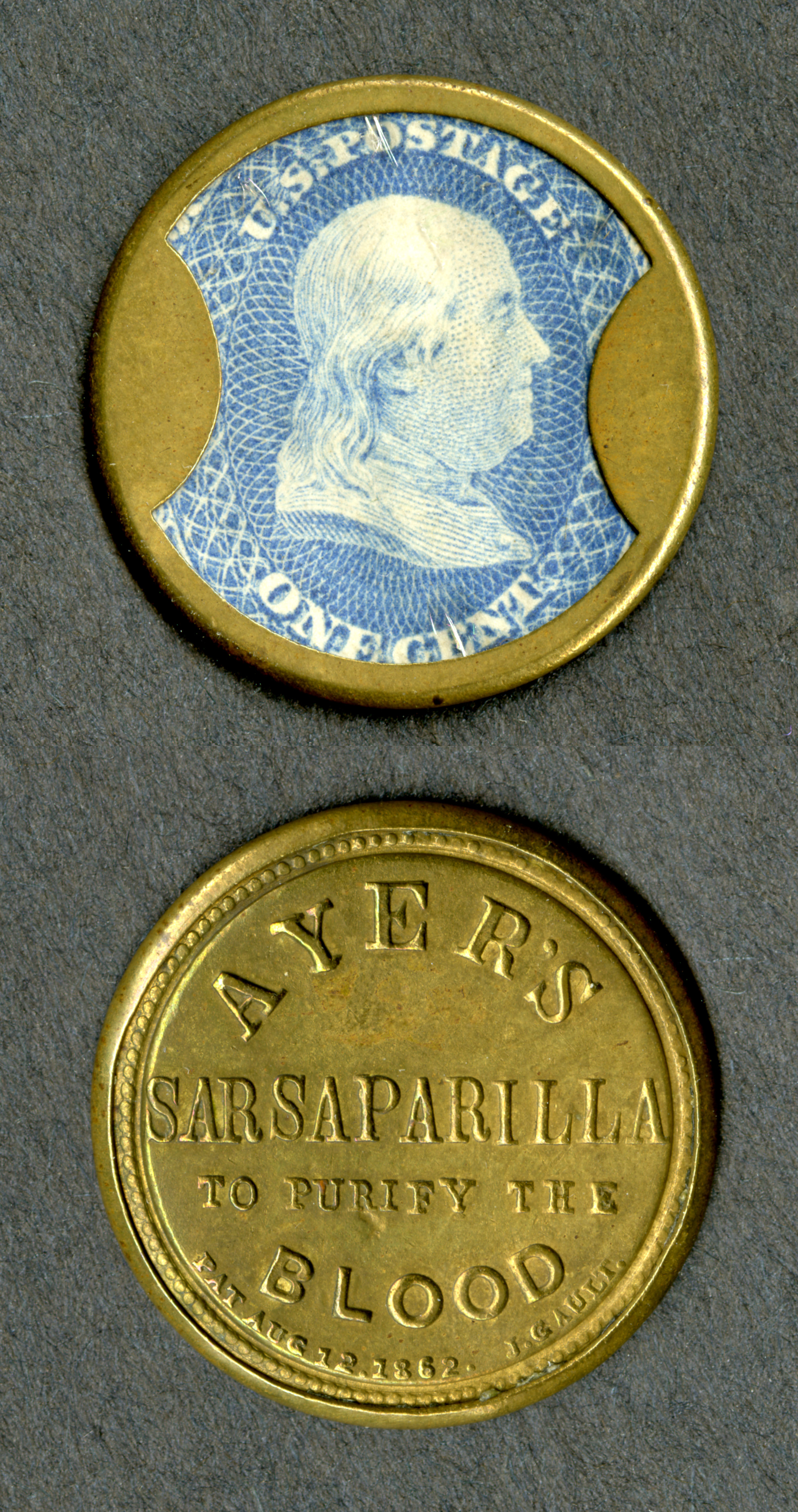
Encased postage stamp advertising Ayer's Sarsaparilla

In 1862, Gault and the American population were faced with a shortage of coins. The government reacted first to this problem by passing a law on July 17, 1862, that allowed postage stamps to be used to pay off debts to the government as long as they were under $5. Stamps were accepted as having value across the US because they were evidence of having paid for postage. This remedial law was only a temporary solution due to the fragile nature of a thin, paper postage stamp. Postage stamps were easily torn and damaged when constantly handled. Gault proposed a solution to this problem in August of that year when he patented his idea of the encased postage stamp. He advertised his invention in the local newspapers as “New Metallic Currency.” His ingenuity was simple and his invention was based on the familiar roundness of coins. As suggested by its name, the encased postage stamp consisted of a postage stamp encased, or sandwiched between two covers made out of brass. Gault constructed the original postage cases out of silver in order for them to more closely resemble real coins. However, Gault found that silver encased postage stamps were too expensive for him to manufacture and the case quickly lost its silver coloring because of continuous handling.

In both the silver and more common brass versions, he cut a hole in the front cover and this acted as a frame around the stamp. Gault placed a layer of mica between the stamp and the front cover of brass, which allowed the stamp to be visible through the covering while maintaining the integrity of the stamp. In order to construct the final product, Gault used a button making machine to press the pieces together and ultimately fold the brass frame covering over the backing of the “coin.” Most of the encased postage stamps were sold in denominations of 5 and 10 cents. However, Gault also produced his currency in all the other U. S. postal values then in production: 1, 3, 12, 24, 30, and 90 cents. A few 2 cent encased stamps were produced after the post office began issuing that denomination in 1863.

Raised lettering on the metal backs of the jackets often advertised the goods or services of business firms; these included the Aerated Bread Company, Ayer's Sarsaparilla and Cathartic Pills, Burnett's Cocoaine, Sands Ale, Drake's Plantation Bitters, Buhl & Co. Hats and Furs, Lord & Taylor, Tremont House (Chicago), Joseph L. Bates Fancy Goods, White the Hatter (New York City) and Ellis McAlpin & Co. Dry Goods (Cincinnati).

== Profit motive ==
Gault was a savvy business man and saw two ways that he could profit off the implementation of these new “coins.” First, Gault sold his currency to businesses and stores with high demand for coins at 120% the face value of the stamp. He soon realized that the bare back covering of the currency provided space that could be used for advertising. Companies paid Gault a two-cent premium on top of the cost of the stamp in exchange for a customized case to the specifications of the companies advertising desires. One of Gault's largest business partners was J.C. Ayer who took advantage of Gault's advertising space during the preliminary months of the creation of the currency. At minimum thirty companies stamped advertisements on the backing of his brass currency. Gault sold an estimated $50,000 in encased postage stamps.

== Circulation ==
Gault's “New Metallic Currency” was only a momentary success. His currency circulated for close to a year until the middle of 1863 when fractional currency issued by the government became popular enough to ease the coin shortage. There were a few factors that allowed Gault's invention to thrive for only a short time. One of the main reasons was stamps needed for postage became unavailable. Too many postage stamps were being diverted from their main purpose and used as currency to the point that the solution for a shortage of coins created a shortage of stamps for mail purposes. Secondly, the coins were expensive. It cost more to buy the encased postage than what they were actually valued at in the market. Thus, cheaper solutions for the coin shortage were sought after. Private issue Civil War tokens existed and the implementation of fractional currency came not too long after Gault created encased postage. Finally, Gault lacked a high enough demand for companies willing to buy advertising space on the back of his coins. This absence of demand made it costly for him to keep producing encased postage.

== Legacy ==
Today Gault's encased postage stamps are very rare. Production slowed as Gault began to lose business. People began to tear apart the encased stamps in order to retrieve and maintain the value of the stamp that was kept inside. Only 5,000 are thought to have survived of the 750,000 pieces that were sold from 1862 to 1863. Encased postage stamps created by Gault kept in mint condition can sell for upwards of 4000 dollars.
