= Ayer's Sarsaparilla =

Soft drink sold as medicine

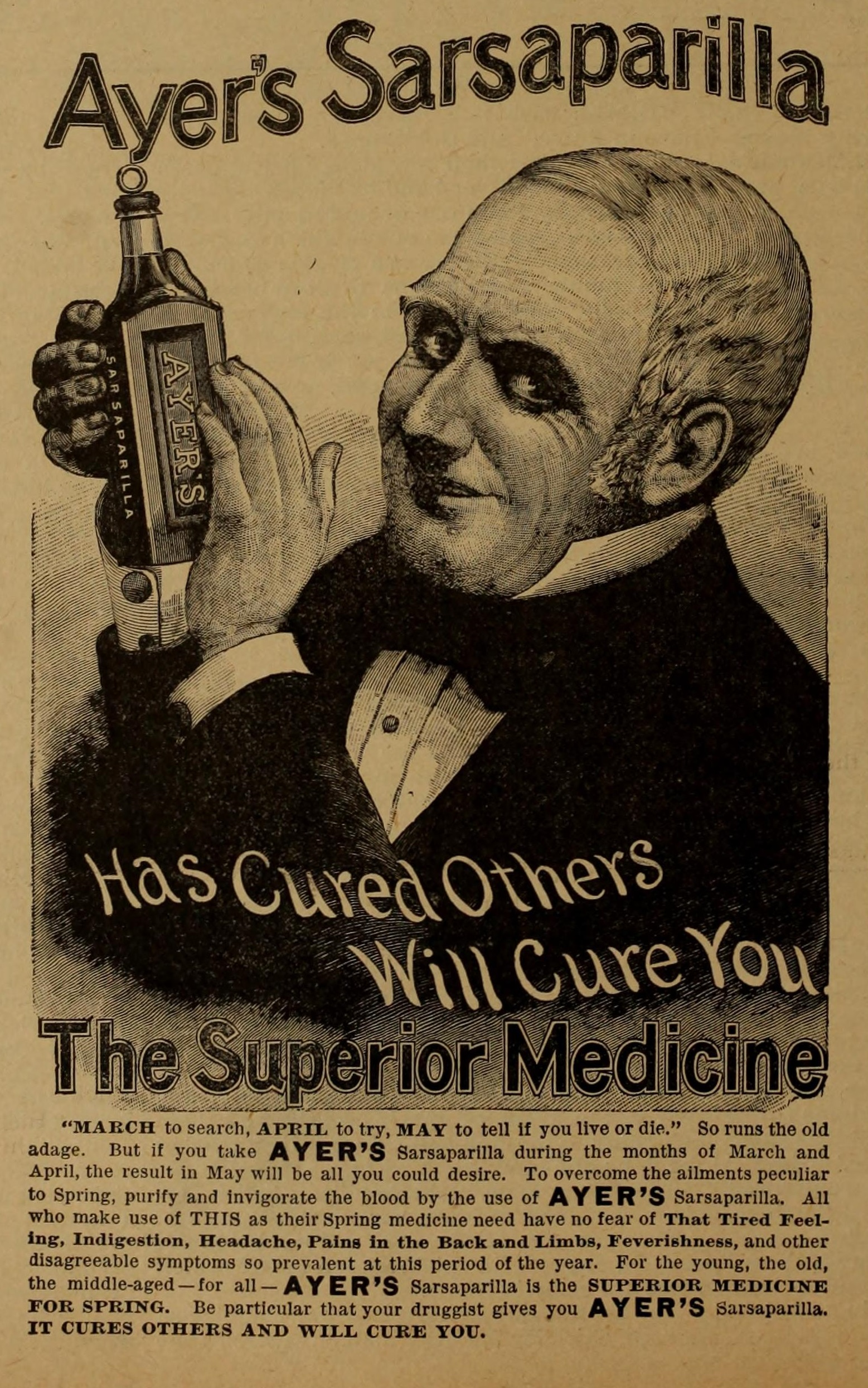
An advertisement boasting the medicinal effects of Ayer's Sarsaparilla

Ayer's Sarsaparilla was a brand of Sarsaparilla invented by James Cook Ayer and sold by his company, Dr. J. C. Ayer and Co. Despite its advertisement as a medicine, its effectiveness is disputed.
