= Bon (currency) =

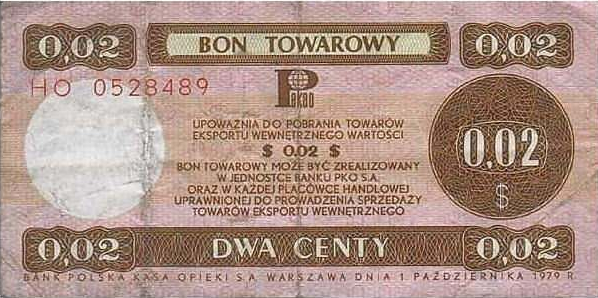
Polish bon towarowy, trade note

The bon (French Canadian, Polish) was a type of paper currency issued by merchants to meet the need for small change. Bon is an abbreviation for bon pour (French for "good for"). These notes were in wide use in the early part of the 19th century. They were sometimes referred to as "shin plasters" by English Canadians. Because of their widespread use, they are considered to be the precursor to modern banknotes.
