= Sergei Mal'tsov =

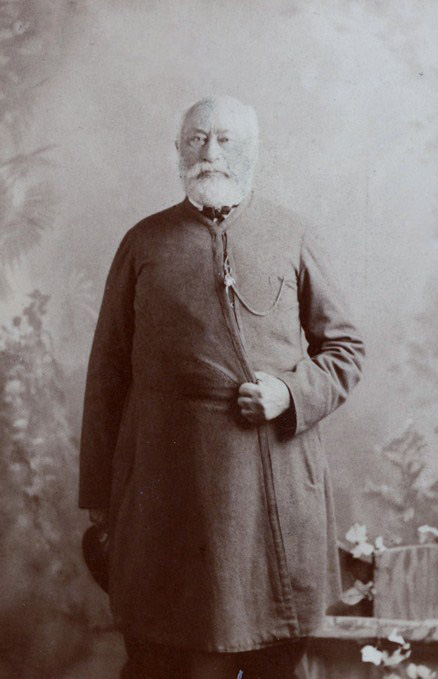
Sergei Mal'tsov in the 1870s

General Sergei Ivanovich Mal'tsov (Russian: Сергей Иванович Мальцов; 1810–1893) was a Russian industrialist of the nineteenth century.

== Biography ==
Sergey received both a home education and studied at school. He has learned three foreign languages. He served in Chevalier Guard Regiment, but resigned in 1833 for health reasons. A year and a half later, he re-enlists in the army and finally retires at the age of 39 with the rank of Major General.

His father, Ivan Akimovich Mal’tsov expanded the family business, previously based on glass and linen production by developing the metallurgy industry in Lyudinovo, Kaluga Oblast. In 1853 his father died. From this basis Sergei developed the Mal’tsov industrial region an area which covered about 215,000 hectares mostly along the Bolva River. He turned the industrial region into a major centre of machine building. It was here that the first rails, locomotives, steamships, and screw propellers were made in Russia. By 1875, Mal’tsov was able to found a corporation which included over 30 enterprises with a combined capital of 6 million rubles.
