= Leper colony money =

Money used for safety in leper colonies

Leper colony money was special money (scrip or vouchers) which circulated only in leper colonies (sanatoriums for people with leprosy) due to the fear that money could carry leprosy and infect other people. However, leprosy is not easily transmitted by casual contact or objects; actual transmission only happens through long-term, constant, intimate contact with leprosy sufferers and not through contact with everyday objects used by sufferers.

Leprosariums emerged during the Middle Ages as places to confine people. They were known as lazarettos due to the Order of Saint Lazarus and his patron saint: protector of hospitals and lepers. These confinement centers were erected in particularly remote areas and had facilities to cover quarantine periods for the sick.

They were used assiduously until a cure for the disease was developed. At the First International Conference on Leprosy (Berlin, 1897), Hansen recommended the isolation of the sick as a preventive measure. Other specialists also proposed minting coins for restricted use in such places. These measures were in force until 1981 when the World Health Organization determined a treatment to cure the disease.

Special leper colony money was used between 1901 and around 1955.

The original reason for leper colony money was the prevention of leprosy in healthy persons. In 1938, Dr. Gordon Alexander Ryrie in Malaysia proved that the paper money was not contaminated with leprosy bacteria, and all the leper colony banknotes were burned in that country.

== Early modern period ==
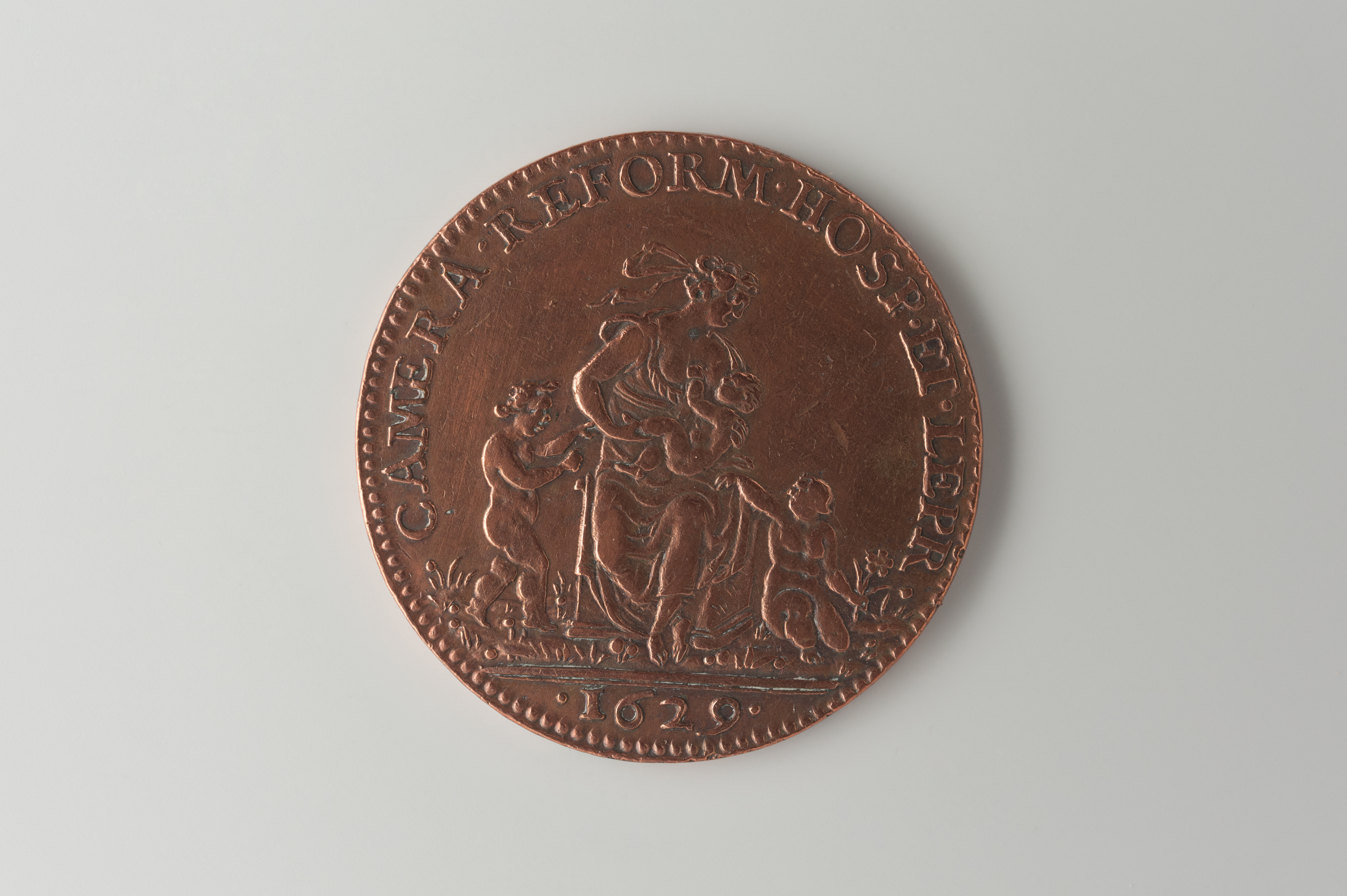
1629 token issued in France. Text reads CAMERA REFORM HOSP ET LEPR (Camera Reformata Hospitalis et Leprosaria; 'Reformed Chamber of the Hospital and Leprosarium').

With the 1629–1631 Italian plague came a great increase in the population of lazarettos and leper colonies in Europe. Inmates were issued with metal tokens that they could use to buy food and cloth; the coins were worthless outside the leper colony, which helped to prevent the patients from leaving.

== Early special money ==
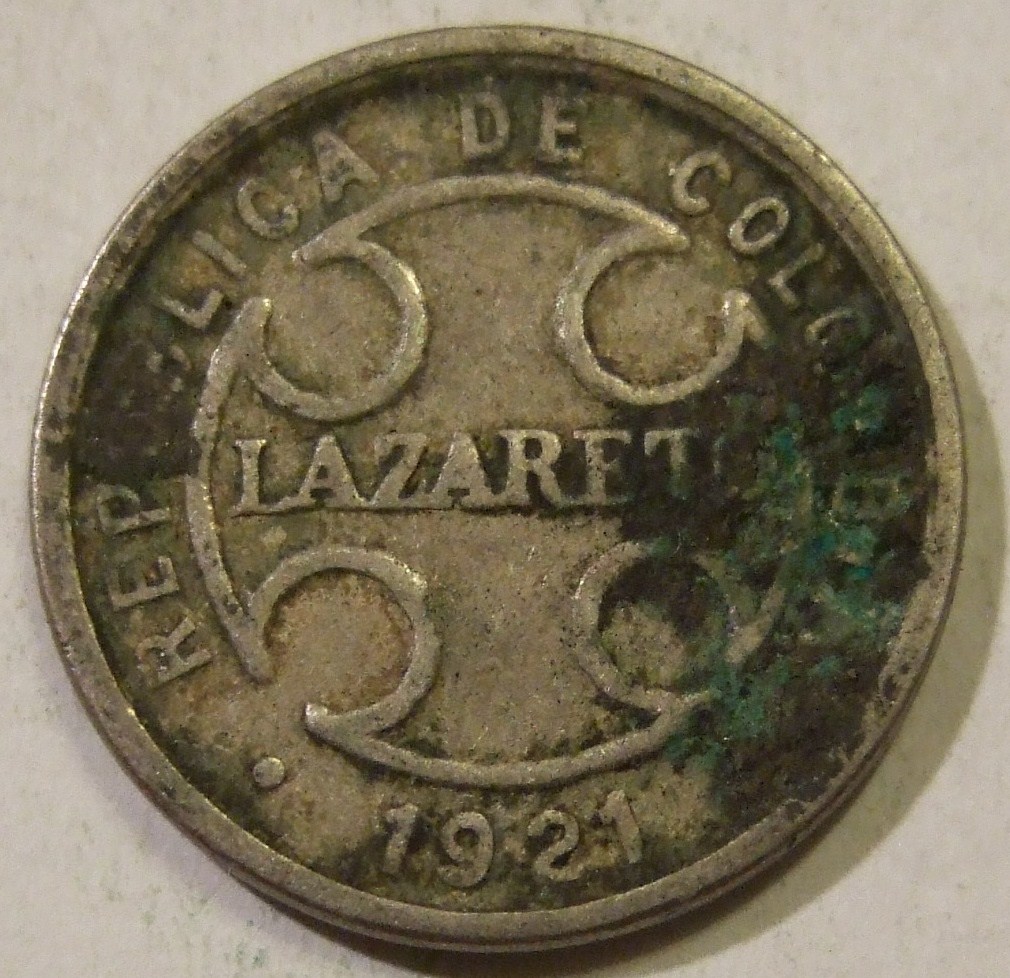
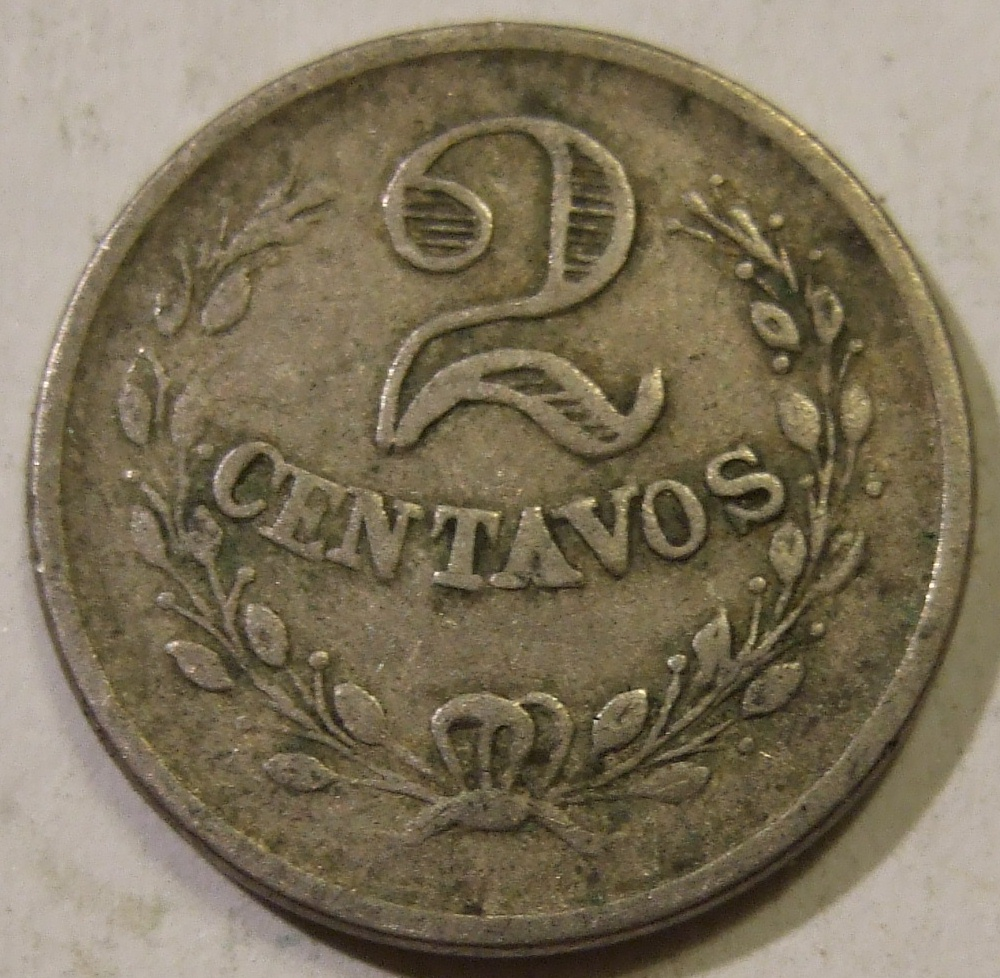
Obverse (left) and reverse (right) of Colombian 2-centavo coin from 1921

The oldest special money known was made in 1901 for use in three leper colonies of Colombia, called Agua de Dios, Cano de Loro, and Contratación. Five denominations of coins were issued: 2.5 centavos, 5 centavos, 10 centavos, 20 centavos, and 50 centavos. "República de Colombia 1901" was engraved. These coins were issued after the first leprosy congress in Berlin in 1897.

== Special money made in the US ==
Between 1919 and 1952, special coins were used in a Panama Canal Zone leper colony called Palo Seco Colony. One cent, 5 cents, 10 cents, 25 cents, 50 cents, and one dollar coins were made in the United States, with one hole in the coins.

== Philippines ==
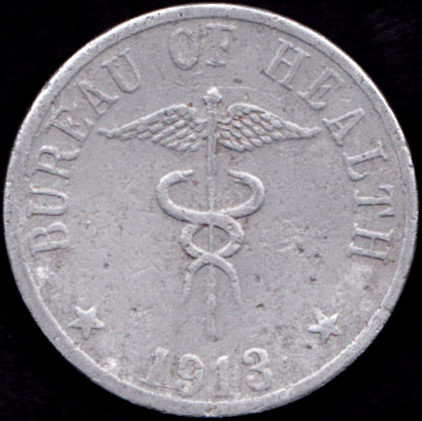
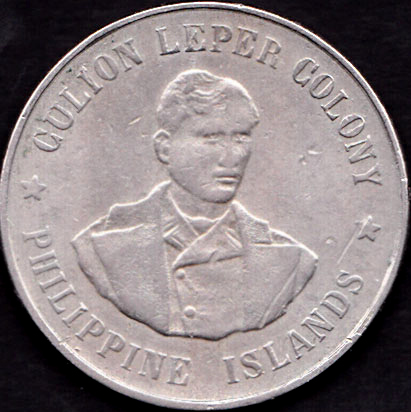
Obverse of Culion leper colony 1-peso coins from 1913 (left) and 1925 (right).

From 1913 to 1930, special aluminum (later copper-nickel) coins were minted in Manila for use in the Culion leper colony of the Insular Government of the Philippine Islands (then under the United States). In 1942, during the Japanese occupation of World War II, emergency paper money was also issued inside the Culion colony. The currency was discontinued after leprosy became a treatable disease in the 1980s, and the island of Culion itself was declared leprosy-free in 2006.

== Japan ==
In 1919, special coins were made in Tama Zenshoen Sanatorium, and later in other sanatoriums in Japan. It is a characteristic of the special money of Japan that coins and in some cases money in papers or plastic were issued by the sanatoriums and not by the government. However, patients liked banknotes or coins of the Japan Bank. When patients were hospitalized, their money was changed for special money, so that this system was used also for the strengthening of segregation. In some sanatoriums, special money served as allowances for poor patients. By 1955 this system had been discontinued in Japan, in some cases initiated by crimes.

== Malaysia ==
In 1936, 5 cents, 10 cents and 1 dollar notes were issued in the Sungei Buloh Settlement in Federated Malay States (today Malaysia), printed in four languages. The director, Dr. Gordon Alexander Ryrie, sent the special banknotes for examination and it was proved that the notes did not carry leprosy. All special banknotes were burned in a bonfire in that country in 1938.

== Other countries ==
Leper colony money is also known to have existed in Brazil, China, Costa Rica, Korea, Nigeria, Thailand, and Venezuela.

== References and sources ==
Sources

- The numismatic aspects of leprosy. Money, Medals and Miscellanea (1993) Roger R. McFadden, John Grost, Dennis F. Marr. D.C. McDonald Associates, Inc. USA.
