= Méreau (token) =

The méreau (plural: méreaux; obsolete spelling: merel, merelles, marelles, mereaulx) was a token, most often made of metal but sometimes leather or parchment, used in France during the Late Middle Ages and Reformation.

Its name goes back to Latin: merere, "to deserve". Méreaux emerged in churches as tokens that entitled clergy to receive certain amount of bread or other food in substantial amounts (part of which was supposed to be later distributed among the poor). In the 15th century there were méreaux of high denominations: 5, 20, 30 and 45 deniers, and priests could exchange them for real coins.

Méreaux are similar to Notgeld by their function. Later on méreaux came into use by medieval guilds and professional corporations until their decline at the end of the 18th century. After abolition of the Edict of Nantes, Calvinists provided méreaux to their members traveling to other Calvinist communities to distinguish them from Catholic spies. Méreaux entitled their bearers to a Holy Communion and should be collected by the priest serving the Communion.

Collecting méreaux is called merellophilia.

== See also ==
- Nine men's morris
