= Bryan Money =

Bryan Money is a term used by numismatists to refer to tokens and medals associated with William Jennings Bryan's platform during the United States presidential elections of 1896 and 1900. Bryan's platform advocated for the reinstatement of silver currency in the United States economy as part of the short-lived Silver Republican Party.

== Political context ==
Following the demonetization of silver with the Coinage Act of 1873 and economic tensions caused by the Panic of 1893, tensions arose between factions of both the Democratic and Republican political parties. Some wished to maintain a single gold standard, while others advocated for a bi-metal standard in which silver would be valued at a rate of 16 ounces for every ounce of gold. During the 1896 and 1900 elections, Bryan, along with several lesser parties, argued for a dual standard because it would enable the government to put more paper money into circulation, as it could be backed by both gold and silver. His opponent William McKinley's platform preserved the gold standard. McKinley's supporters issued Bryan Money as a political statement about these dueling standards.

Bryan expounded the free coinage of silver using the ratio of 16 ounces of silver to 1 ounce of gold. For example, $0.53 of silver would produce a silver dollar, which is what the Morgan dollar contained. If the government issued dollars containing 100 cents worth of silver, they would have been very large and cumbersome. Bryan's opponents quickly exaggerated the size of this coin.

== Types of Bryan Money ==
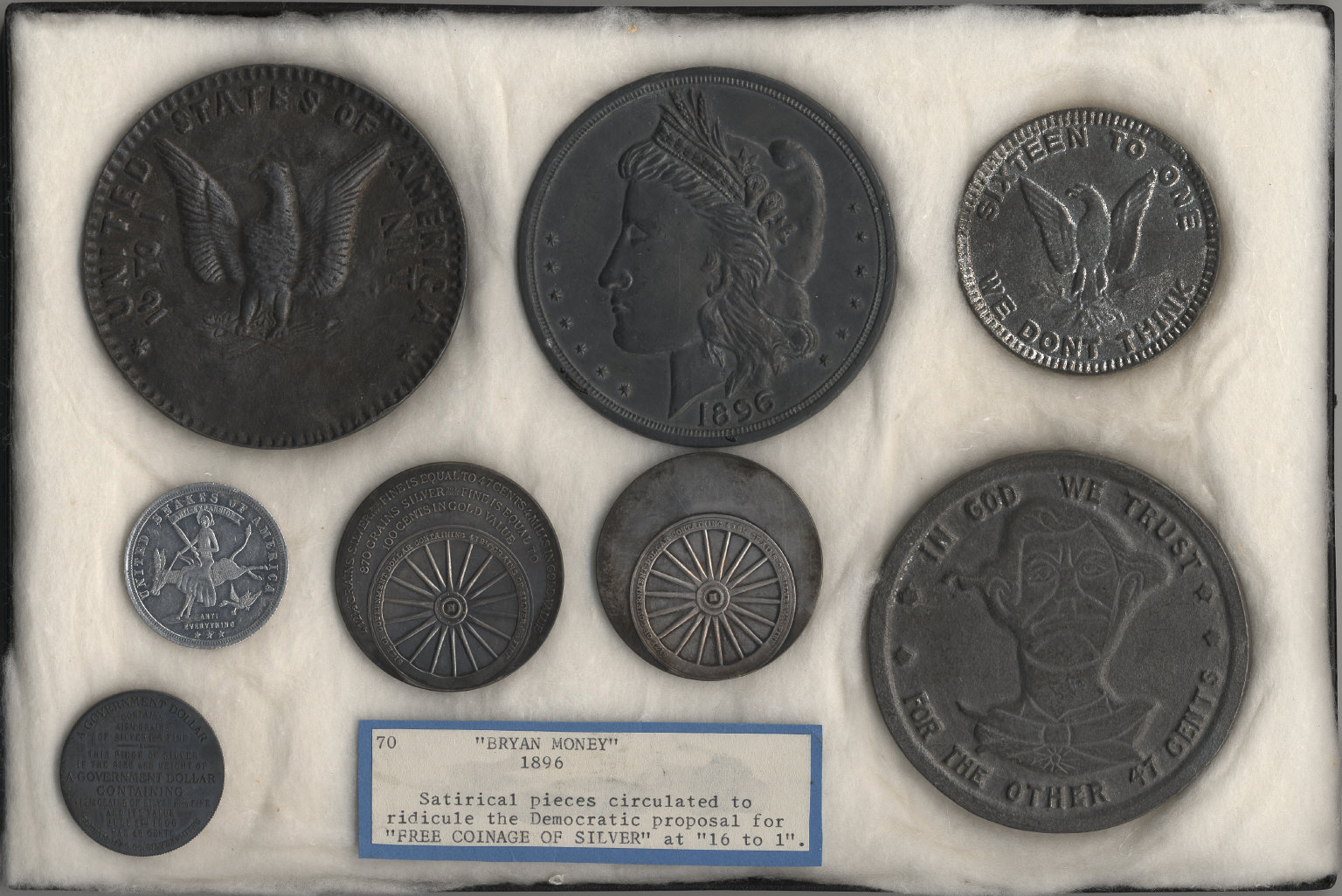
Collection of Bryan Money from 1896 to 1900

Bryan Money falls into two categories: comparative and satirical. Comparative tokens were made of coin silver by true silversmiths. Their main purpose was to compare the size and ratio of silver needed for dual standard currency to silver's market price. These pieces were modeled after the silver dollar format and were later banned due to counterfeiting concerns.

Satirical tokens bore "derisive or humorous inscriptions" that mocked the proposed dual standard. Many pieces had similar slogans such as "In God We Trust for the Other 47 Cents" and "16 to 1 NIT" (Not In Trust), referring to the proposed value ratio of silver to gold. These pieces were more often cast or struck and made of type metal or alloys of lead and aluminum. Other designs were made of less typical materials such as iron, copper, tin or cardboard. After the design's initial production, individual craftsmen would often copy them in a crude fashion and distribute them to fellow supporters, contributing to the variety of quality of Bryan Monies.

== Collecting Bryan Money ==
Bryan Money was never intended for circulation and was rarely carried so it was spared the normal wear of other collectible currency. Most imperfections consist of rim bumps and scratches from accidental damage or graffiti. Grading by third parties and an interest in so-called dollars increased the value of many Bryan pieces.

Bryan Money designs were also used in other collectibles. These included "Campaign Bills" in which the designs were printed on material similar to paper money, and silk fabrics with embroidered designs that were used for neckties and other purposes.

Coin collectors had little interest in Bryan Money in the late 1800s because it was not a true currency, but rather political commentary. Farran Zerbe raised awareness of the tokens' collectible nature when he published his definitive catalog, Bryan Money: Tokens of the Presidential Campaigns of 1896 and 1900 - Comparative and Satirical, in the July 1926 volume of The Numismatist. Now, due to its political relevance, both numismatists and collectors of political memorabilia take interest in Bryan Money.

Zerbe's article captured what makes Bryan Money distinctive from other collectible currency:

"Bryan Money is unique as a series. The monetary-political issue, conditions and temperament of the time, and the tolerance of disregard for the letter of the law, all being in favorable conjunction, made possible what never before or may never again occur - such a large and interesting variety of grotesque political satires in metal."

== Images ==
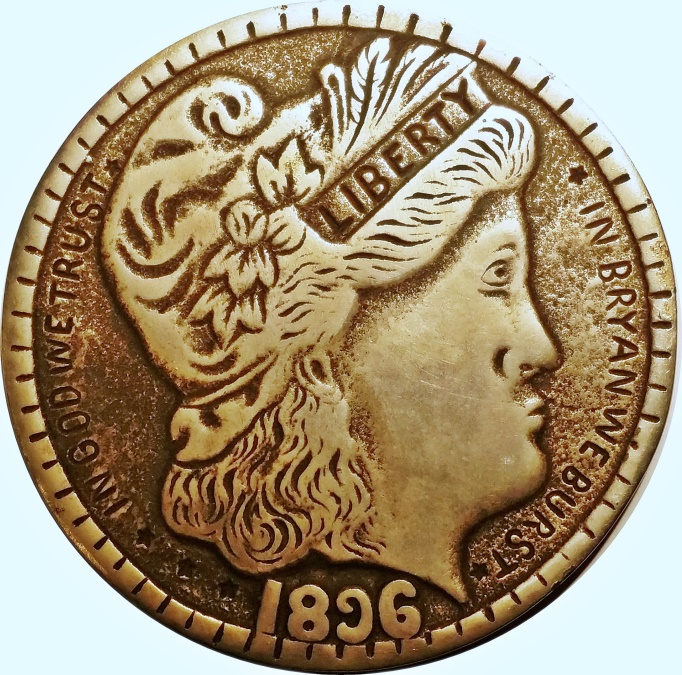
Satirical dollar obverse mocking Bryan's proposed 16:1 Ratio (obverse)

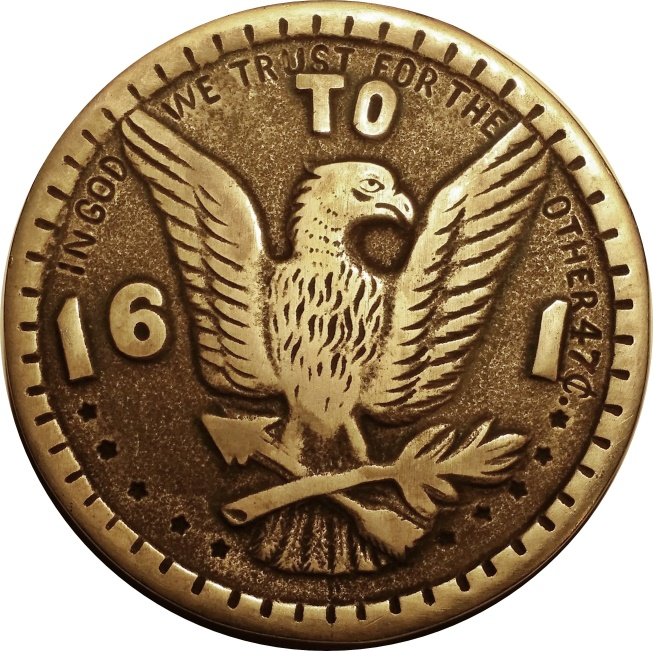
Satirical dollar reverse mocking Bryan's proposed 16:1 Ratio (reverse)

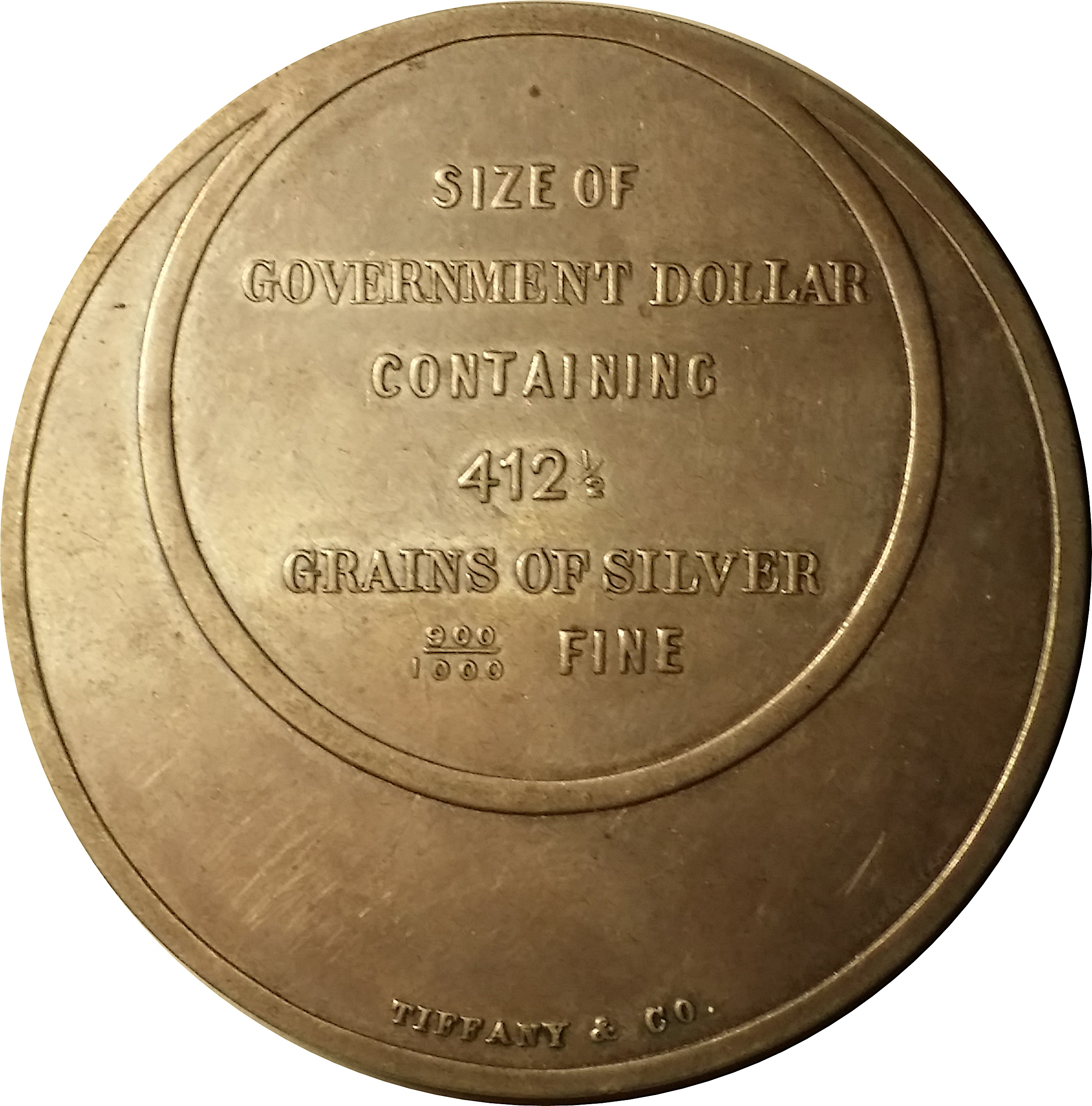
Comparative Dollar produced by Tiffany & Co. (obverse)

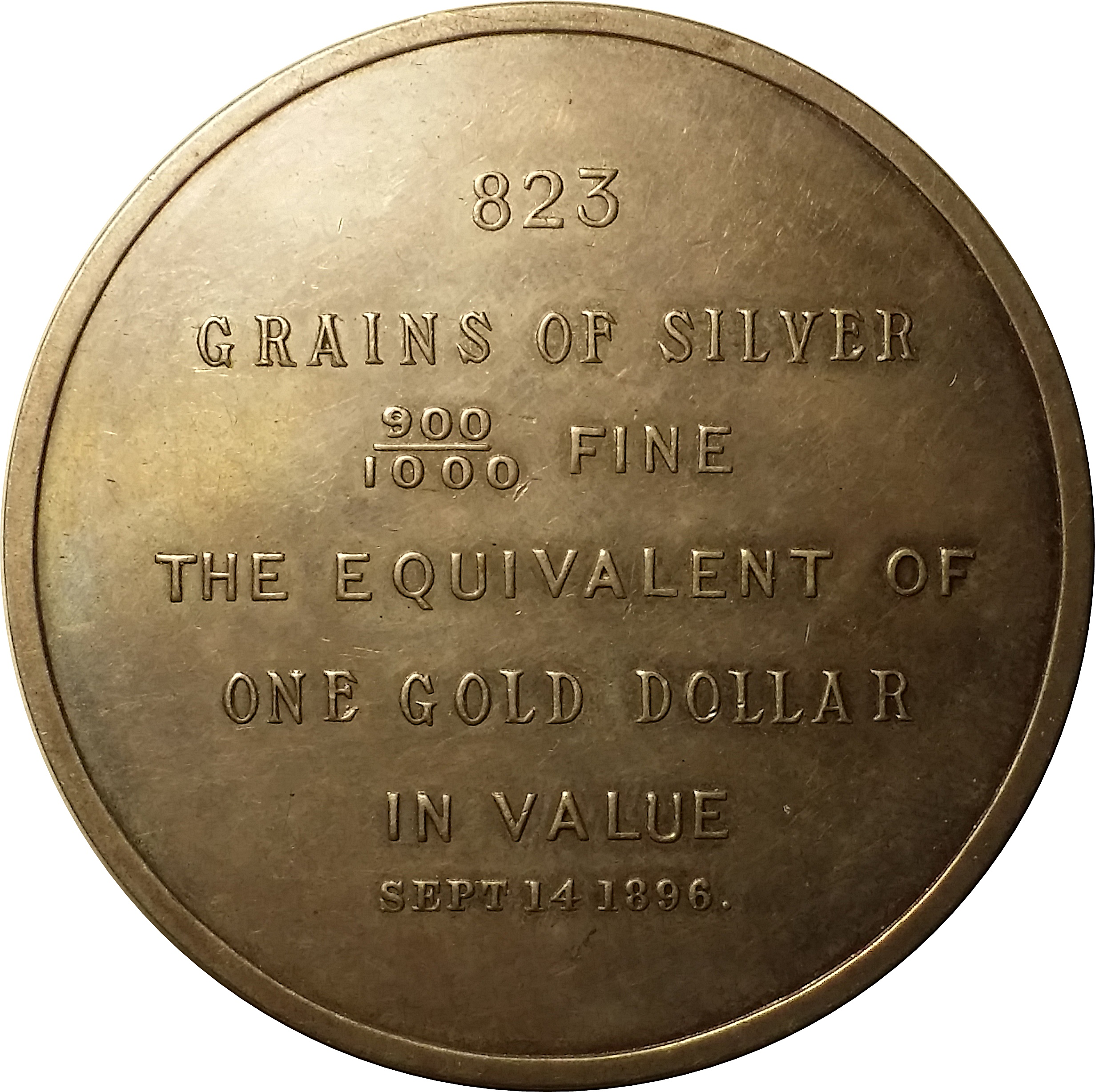
Comparative Dollar produced by Tiffany and Co. (reverse)
