= Wooden nickel =

Style of token coin

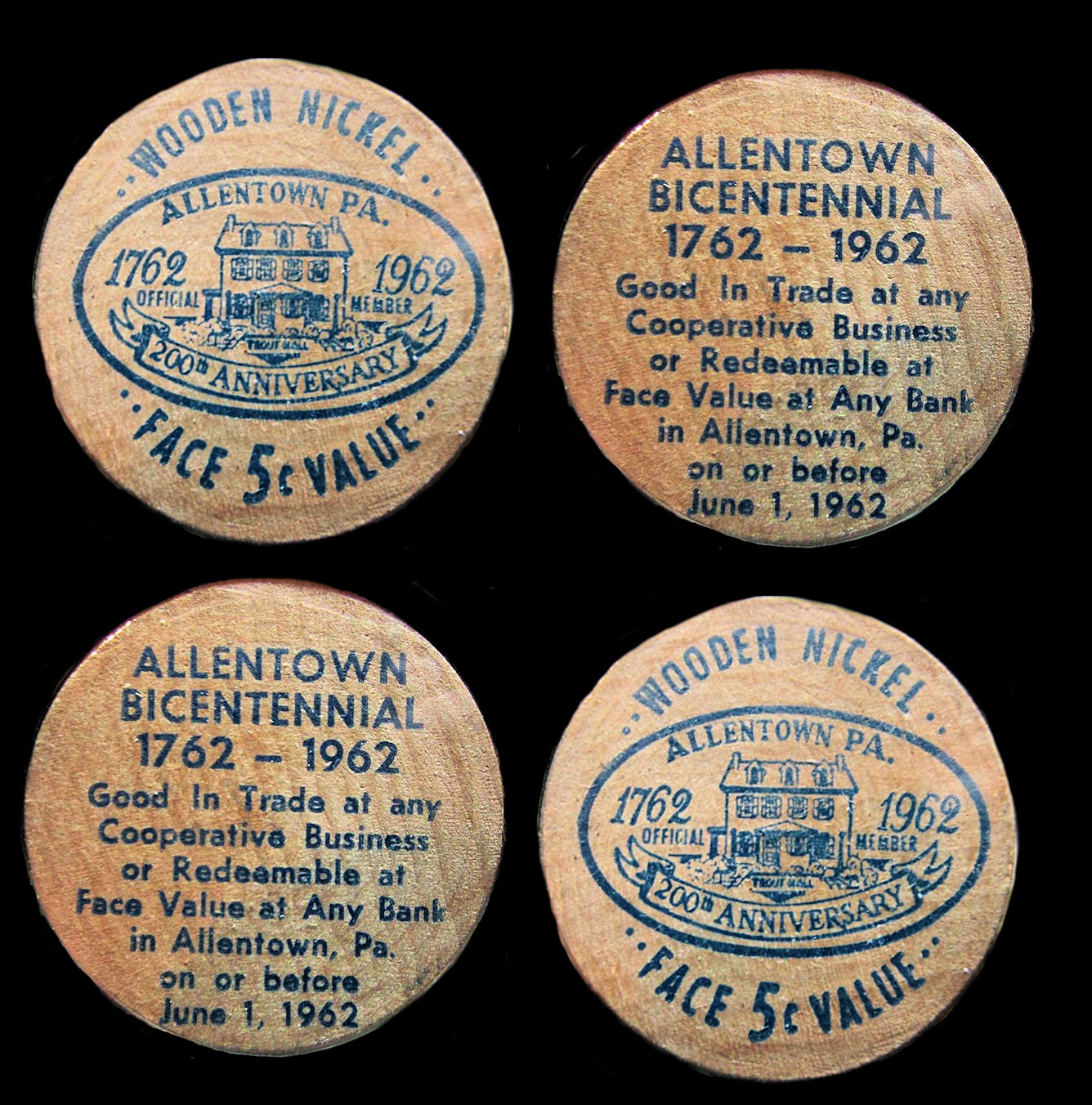
Wooden nickels from the Allentown, Pennsylvania Bicentennial in 1962

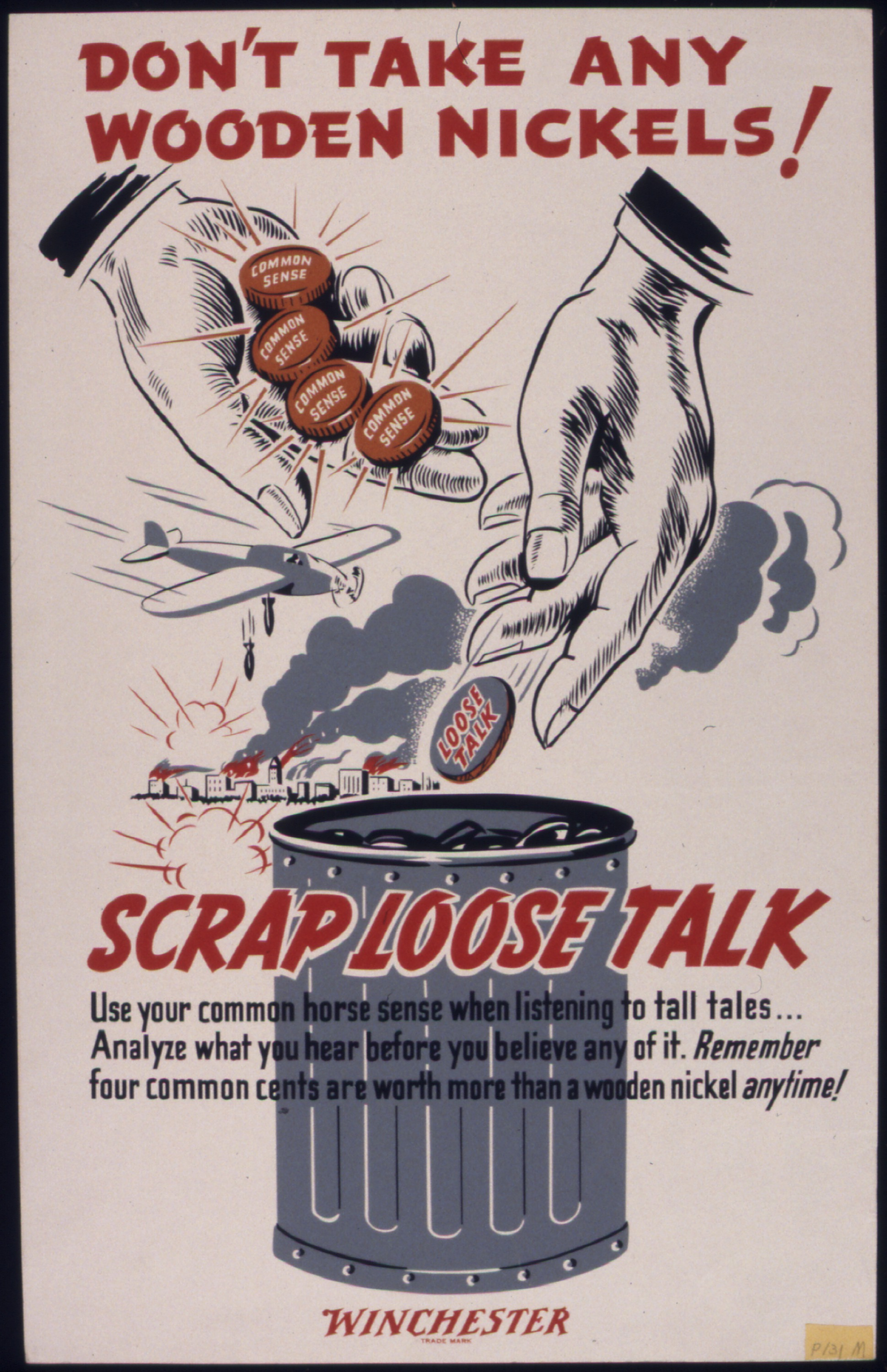
Office for Emergency Management, War Production Board (circa 1942–43)

In the United States, a wooden nickel is a wooden token coin, usually issued by a merchant or bank as a promotion, sometimes redeemable for a specific item such as a drink.

Scrip and tokens have often been issued locally in times of severe economic distress such as financial crises and the American Civil War. During the Great Depression, after the failure of the Citizens Bank of Tenino in Tenino, Washington, the local Chamber of Commerce teamed up with the local newspaper to issue scrip equivalent to 25% of people's bank deposits that could be spent at local merchants. Blaine, Washington, soon did the same with both flat scrip and, in response to requests generated by news and word of mouth, coins that included a 5-cent piece. The Chicago World's Fair in 1933 issued wooden nickels as souvenirs, and the tradition of wooden nickels as tokens and souvenirs continues to the present day.

In 2020, Tenino, Washington began issuing wooden scrip again to help its citizens and local merchants via its COVID-19 Grant Recovery program. Upon successful grant application, the grantee would be able to spend the wooden scrip at participating shops in the town. Alternatively, the recipient could use the scrip, or equivalent credit, towards their municipal utility bills.

An American adage, "Don't take any wooden nickels", is considered a lighthearted reminder to be cautious in one's dealings. This adage precedes the use of wooden nickels as a replacement currency, suggesting that its origins lie not in the genuine monetary value of nickels, but rather in their purely commemorative nature.
