= Mary Baird Bryan =

American writer and suffragette (1861–1930)

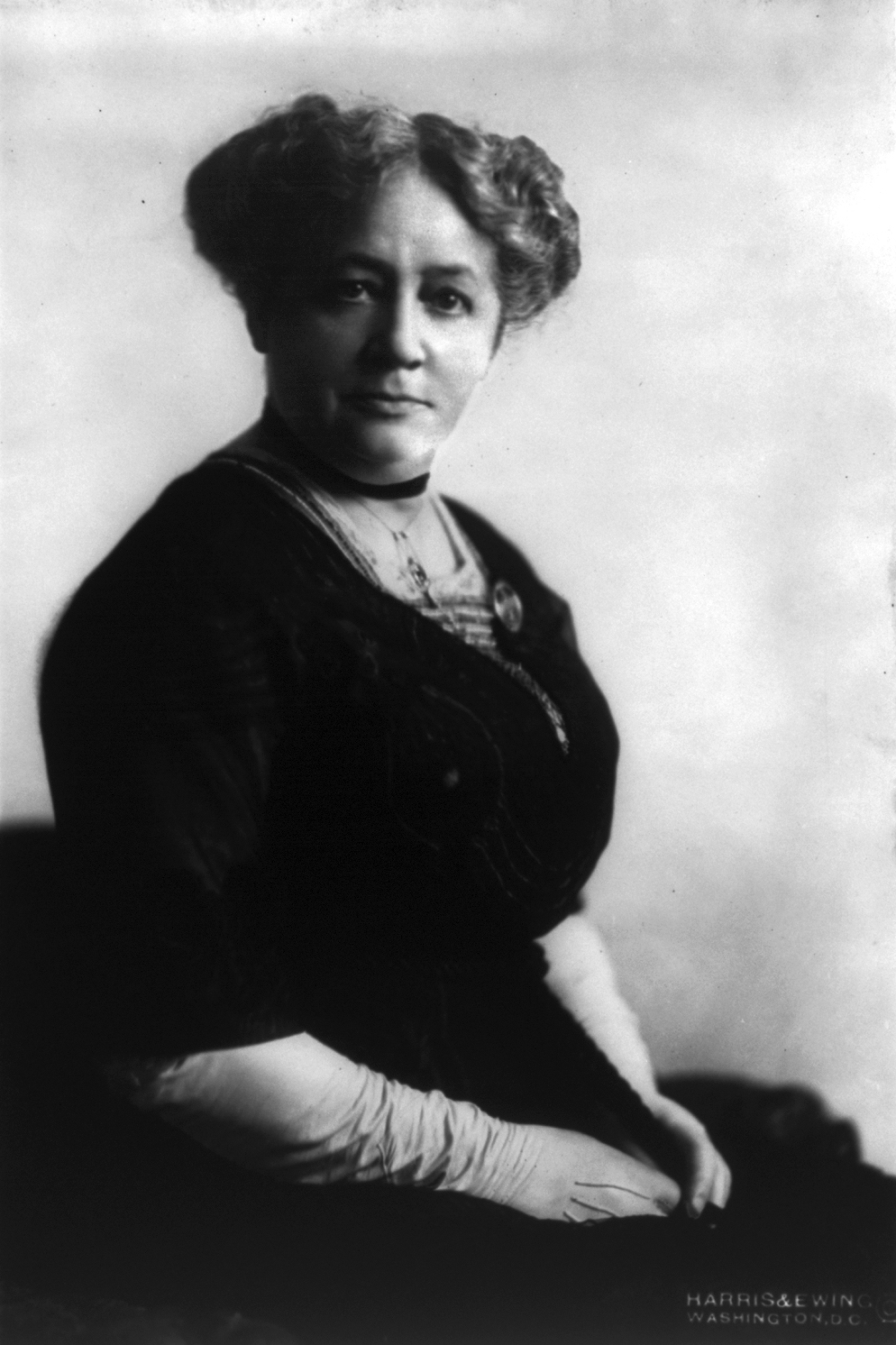
Mary Baird Bryan

Mary Elizabeth Baird Bryan (June 17, 1861 – January 30, 1930) was an American attorney, writer, and suffragist. She was married to William Jennings Bryan.

== Life and work ==
Mary Elizabeth Baird was born on June 17, 1861, in Perry, Illinois, the daughter of John and Lovina Baird. Her father owned a general store. Mary Elizabeth began attending Jacksonville Female Academy at the age of 18, called the "Jail for Angels" by locals. In 1879, a student at Illinois College named William Jennings Bryan met and began courting her. Bryan and Mary Elizabeth married on October 1, 1884. While William studied law at Union (now Northwestern School of Law), Mary read law as well on her own, and eventually sat the bar exam in Nebraska; she was admitted to practice in Nebraska in 1888. Mary Elizabeth would emerge as an important part of Bryan's career, managing his correspondence and helping him prepare speeches and articles. Mary passed the bar exam and learned German in order to help his career.

Mary moved to Lincoln, Nebraska, in 1888, and her husband was elected to Congress two years later. In 1896, her husband decided to run for president. A female reporter was assigned to Mary to report on her specifically. Author Willa Cather was skeptical of William but praised Mary. Mary Bryan joined her husband in late September; on The Idler, a private railway car procured by the DNC, and the Bryans were able to eat and sleep in relative comfort. William and Mary Bryan returned to Lincoln, Nebraska on November 1, two days before the election, though he continued campaigning. After the election, which her husband lost, Mary wrote a biographical sketch of her husband in "The First Battle: A Story of the Campaign of 1896", which became a best-seller. He would run for president in 1900 and 1908 and lost those campaigns as well.

In January 1901, Bryan published the first issue of his weekly newspaper, The Commoner, and though Bryan served as the editor and publisher of the newspaper, Charles Bryan, Mary Bryan and Richard Metcalfe performed editorial duties when Bryan was traveling. The Commoner became one of the most widely-read newspapers of its era and content from the papers was frequently reprinted by major newspapers in the Northeast. In 1902, Bryan, his wife and their three children moved into Fairview, a mansion located in Lincoln; Bryan referred to the house as the "Monticello of the West," and frequently invited politicians and diplomats to visit. The family embarked on a world tour in 1905, visiting 18 countries in Asia, the Middle East, and Europe. A newspaper wrote that Mary "has probably traveled over more countries and met more kinds of people than any other woman in the United States."

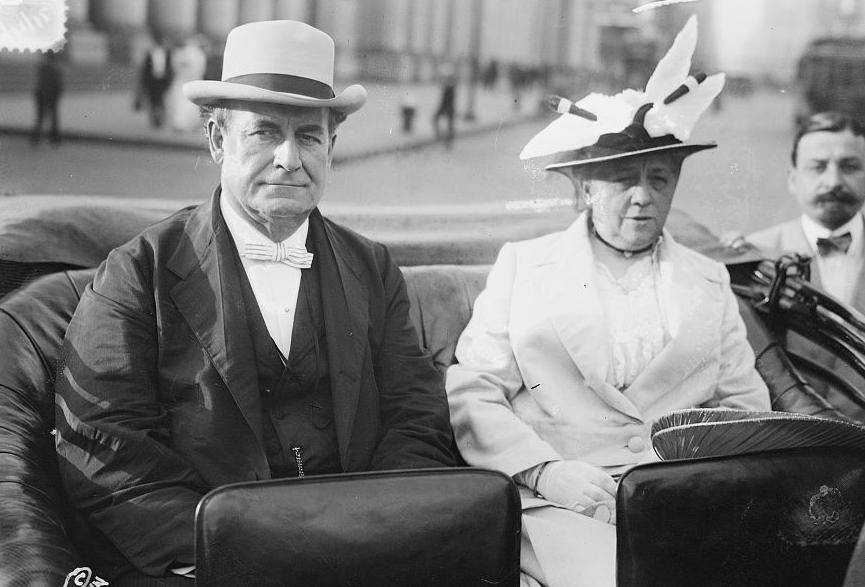
William Jennings Bryan and wife Mary in New York City, June 19, 1915

To help Mary cope with her worsening health during the harsh winters of Nebraska, the Bryans bought a farm in Mission, Texas, in 1909. Due to Mary's arthritis, in 1912 the Bryans began building a new home in Miami, Florida, known as Villa Serena. The Bryans made Villa Serena their permanent home, while Charles Bryan continued to oversee The Commoner from Lincoln. The Bryans were active citizens in Miami, leading a fundraising drive for the YMCA and frequently hosting the public at their home. William was named secretary of state by President Woodrow Wilson in 1913 but resigned in 1915 after Wilson's strong response to the sinking of the RMS Lusitania.

In 1916, Mary moved the household to Miami full-time and became a leader in the Woman's Christian Temperance Union and the National American Woman Suffrage Association. She led a speaking tour of the state on behalf of the suffrage association in 1917. The tour was a hit with reporters, with The Daytona Daily News praising her sweet voice and personality. Mary agreed with the traditional notion that the proper place for a woman was in the home but they should still be allowed to cast a ballot twice a year. In April 1917, she delivered an hour and a half speech to the Florida legislature in favor of a constitutional amendment to enfranchise women. Congress passed the Nineteenth Amendment granting women the right to vote in 1919.

Bryan remained married to Mary, until his death in 1925. Afterwards returning from the funeral in Washington, she wrote more than half of the nearly 600-page memoirs of William Jennings Bryan that were published later that year. She was buried next to Bryan at Arlington National Cemetery after her death in 1930. William and Mary had three children: Ruth, William Jr. and Grace. Ruth won election to Congress in 1928 and later served as the ambassador to Denmark during the presidency of Franklin D. Roosevelt.
