= William Jennings Bryan =

American politician (1860–1925)

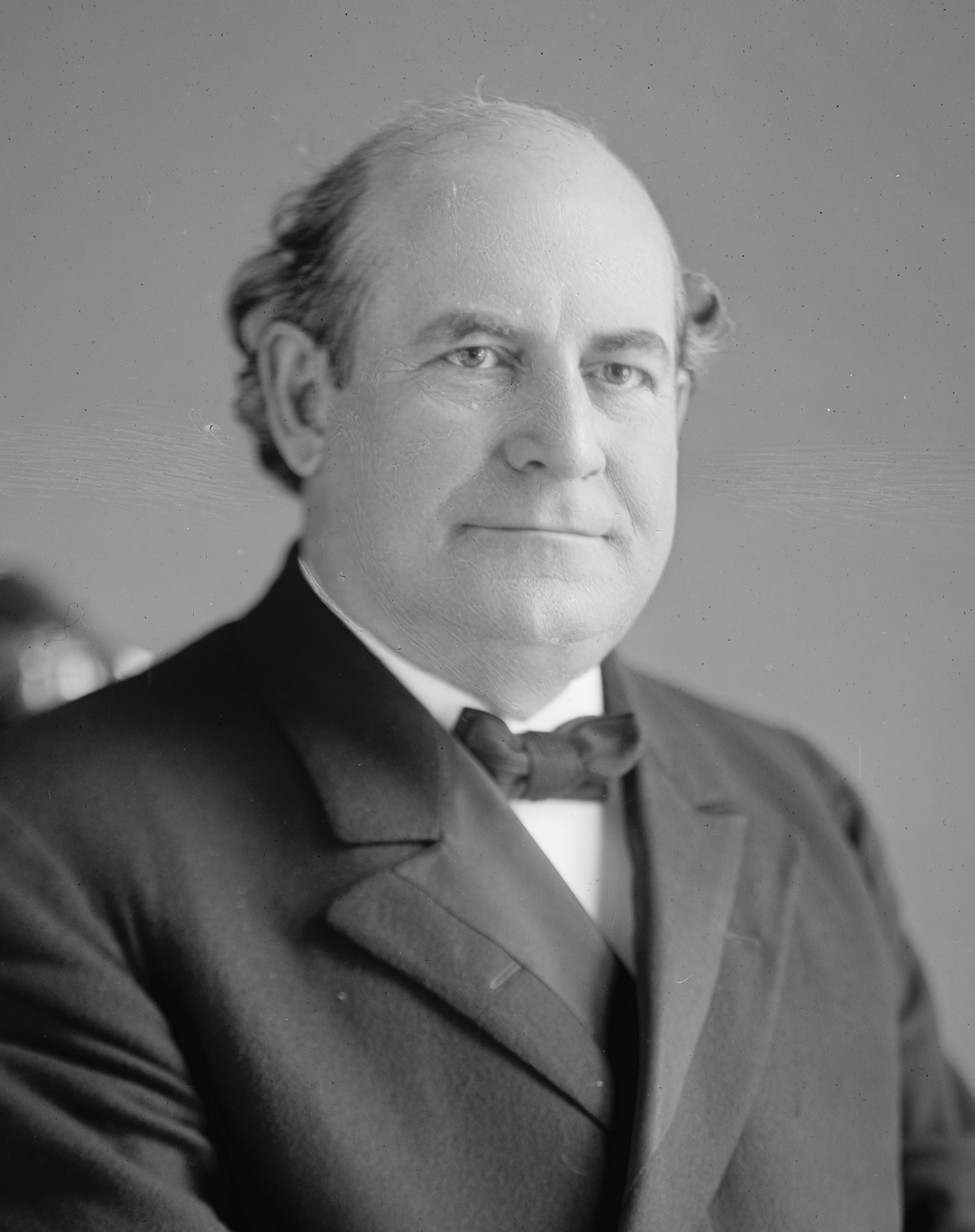
- Bryan, c. 1910s

41st United States Secretary of State
- In office March 5, 1913 – June 9, 1915
- President: Woodrow Wilson
- Preceded by: Philander C. Knox
- Succeeded by: Robert Lansing

Member of the U.S. House of Representatives from Nebraska's 1st district
- In office March 4, 1891 – March 3, 1895
- Preceded by: William James Connell
- Succeeded by: Jesse Burr Strode

Personal details
- Born: March 19, 1860 Salem, Illinois, U.S.
- Died: July 26, 1925 (aged 65) Dayton, Tennessee, U.S.
- Resting place: Arlington National Cemetery
- Party: Democratic
- Other political affiliations: Populist
- Spouse: Mary Baird Bryan (m. 1884)
- Children: Ruth; William Jr.; Grace
- Parent: Silas Bryan (father)
- Relatives: Charles Bryan (brother); William Sherman Jennings (cousin)
- Education: Illinois College (BA); Union College of Law (LLB)

Military service
- Branch/service: United States Army
- Years of service: 1898
- Rank: Colonel
- Unit: 3rd Nebraska Volunteer Infantry
- Battles/wars: Spanish–American War
- William Jennings Bryan's voice Reciting his Cross of Gold speech. An original recording of the speech may exist. Recorded 1921

William Jennings Bryan (March 19, 1860 – July 26, 1925) was an American lawyer, orator, and politician. He was a dominant force in the Democratic Party, running three times as the party's nominee for President of the United States in the 1896, 1900, and 1908 elections. He served in the House of Representatives from 1891 to 1895 and as the secretary of state under Woodrow Wilson from 1913 to 1915. Because of his faith in the wisdom of the common people, Bryan was often called "the Great Commoner", and because of his rhetorical power and early fame as the youngest presidential candidate, "the Boy Orator".

Born and raised in Illinois, Bryan moved to Nebraska in the 1880s. He won election to the House of Representatives in the 1890 elections, served two terms, and made an unsuccessful run for the Senate in 1894. At the 1896 Democratic National Convention, Bryan delivered his "Cross of Gold" speech, which attacked the gold standard and the eastern moneyed interests and crusaded for inflationary policies built around the expanded coinage of silver coins. In a repudiation of incumbent President Grover Cleveland and his conservative Bourbon Democrats, the Democratic convention nominated Bryan for president, making Bryan the youngest major party presidential nominee in U.S. history. Subsequently, Bryan was also nominated for president by the left-wing Populist Party, and many Populists would eventually follow Bryan into the Democratic Party. In the intensely-fought 1896 presidential election, the Republican nominee, William McKinley, emerged triumphant. At age 36, Bryan remains the youngest person in United States history to receive an electoral vote for president and cumulatively, the most electoral votes without ever being elected president. Bryan gained fame as an orator, as he invented the national stumping tour when he reached an audience of 5 million people in 27 states in 1896, and continued to deliver well-attended lectures on the Chautauqua circuit well into the 20th century.

Bryan retained control of the Democratic Party and again won the nomination for the 1900 presidential election. After serving as a colonel in the 3rd Nebraska Infantry Regiment during the Spanish–American War, Bryan became a fierce opponent of American imperialism, and much of his campaign centered on that issue. In the election, McKinley again defeated Bryan and won several Western states that Bryan had won in 1896. Bryan's influence in the party weakened after the 1900 election, and the Democrats nominated the conservative Alton B. Parker in the 1904 presidential election. Bryan regained his stature in the party after Parker's resounding defeat by Theodore Roosevelt and voters from both parties increasingly embraced some of the progressive reforms that had long been championed by Bryan. Bryan won his party's nomination in the 1908 presidential election but was defeated by Roosevelt's chosen successor, William Howard Taft. Along with Henry Clay, Bryan is one of the two individuals who never won a presidential election despite receiving electoral votes in three separate presidential elections held after the ratification of the 12th Amendment.

After the Democrats won the 1912 presidential election, Wilson rewarded Bryan's support with the important cabinet position of Secretary of State. Bryan helped Wilson pass several progressive reforms through Congress. In 1915, before the US joined World War I, he considered that Wilson was too harsh on Germany and finally resigned after Wilson had sent Germany a note of protest with a veiled threat of war in response to the sinking of the Lusitania by a German U-boat. After leaving office, Bryan retained some of his influence within the Democratic Party but increasingly devoted himself to Prohibition, religious matters, and anti-evolution activism. He opposed Darwinism on religious and humanitarian grounds, most famously as a prosecutor in the 1925 Scopes trial, dying soon after. Bryan has elicited mixed reactions from various commentators but is acknowledged by historians as one of the most influential figures of the Progressive Era.

== Early life and education ==
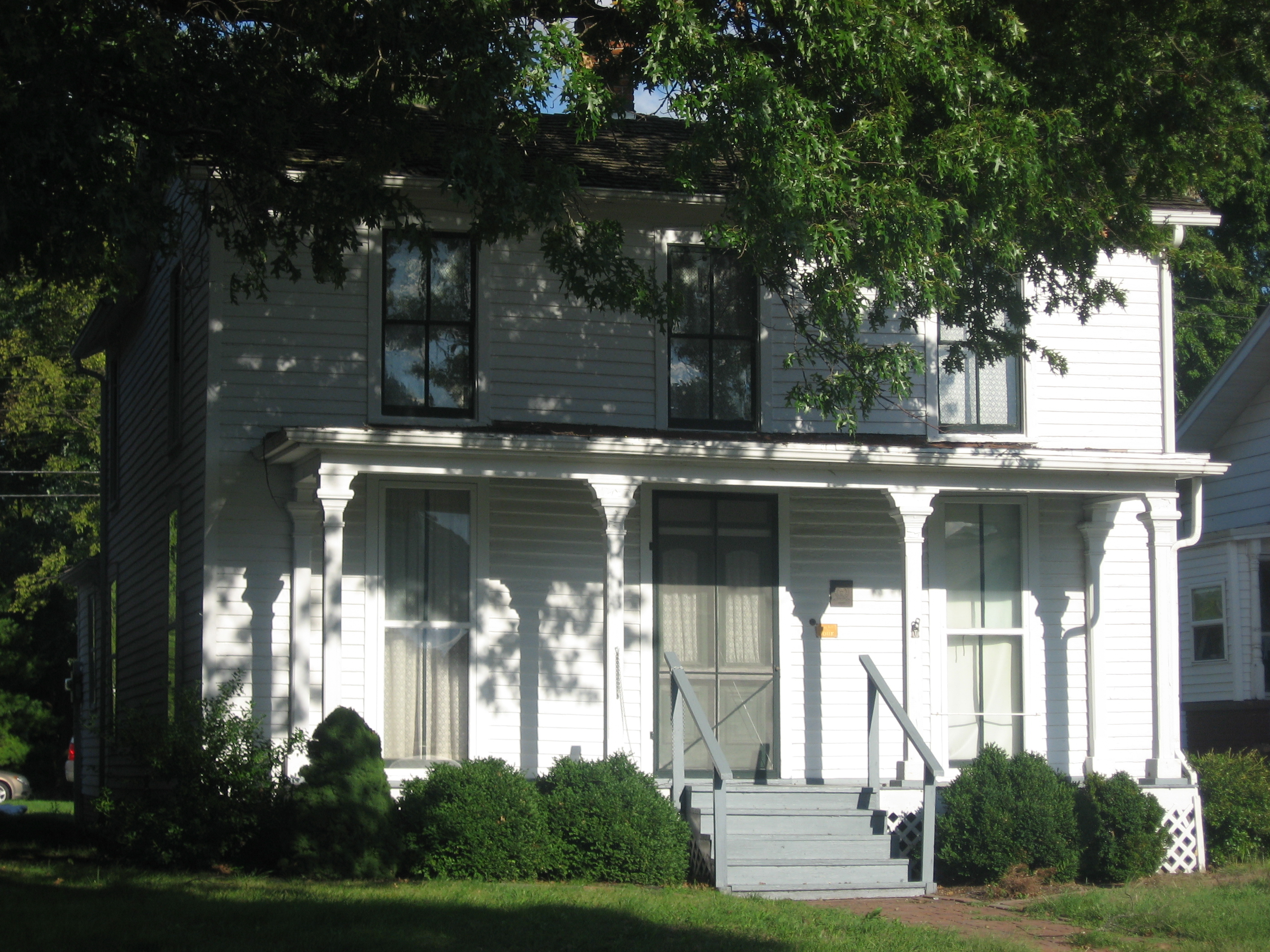
Bryan's birthplace in Salem, Illinois

William Jennings Bryan was born in Salem, Illinois, on March 19, 1860, to Silas Lillard Bryan and Mariah Elizabeth (Jennings) Bryan. Silas Bryan had been born in 1822 and had established a legal practice in Salem in 1851. He married Mariah, a former student of his at McKendree College, in 1852. Of Scots-Irish and English ancestry, (Note: Asked when his family "dropped the 'O'" from his O'Bryan surname, he replied there had never been one.) Silas Bryan was an avid Jacksonian Democrat and an admirer of Andrew Jackson and Stephen A. Douglas, who would pass on his Democratic affiliation to his son, William. Silas Bryan won election as a state circuit judge and in 1866 moved his family to a 520-acre (210.4 ha) farm north of Salem. He lived in a 10-room house that was the envy of Marion County. Silas served in various local positions and sought election to Congress in 1872, but was narrowly defeated by the Republican candidate. William's cousin, William Sherman Jennings, was also a prominent Democrat.

William was the fourth child of Silas and Mariah, but all three of his older siblings died during infancy. He also had 5 younger siblings, four of whom lived to adulthood. William was home-schooled by his mother until the age of 10. Demonstrating a precocious talent for oratory, he gave public speeches as early as the age of four. Silas was a Baptist and Mariah was a Methodist, but William's parents allowed him to choose his own church. At age 14, he had a conversion experience at a revival. He said that it was the most important day of his life. At 15, he was sent to attend Whipple Academy, a private school in Jacksonville, Illinois.

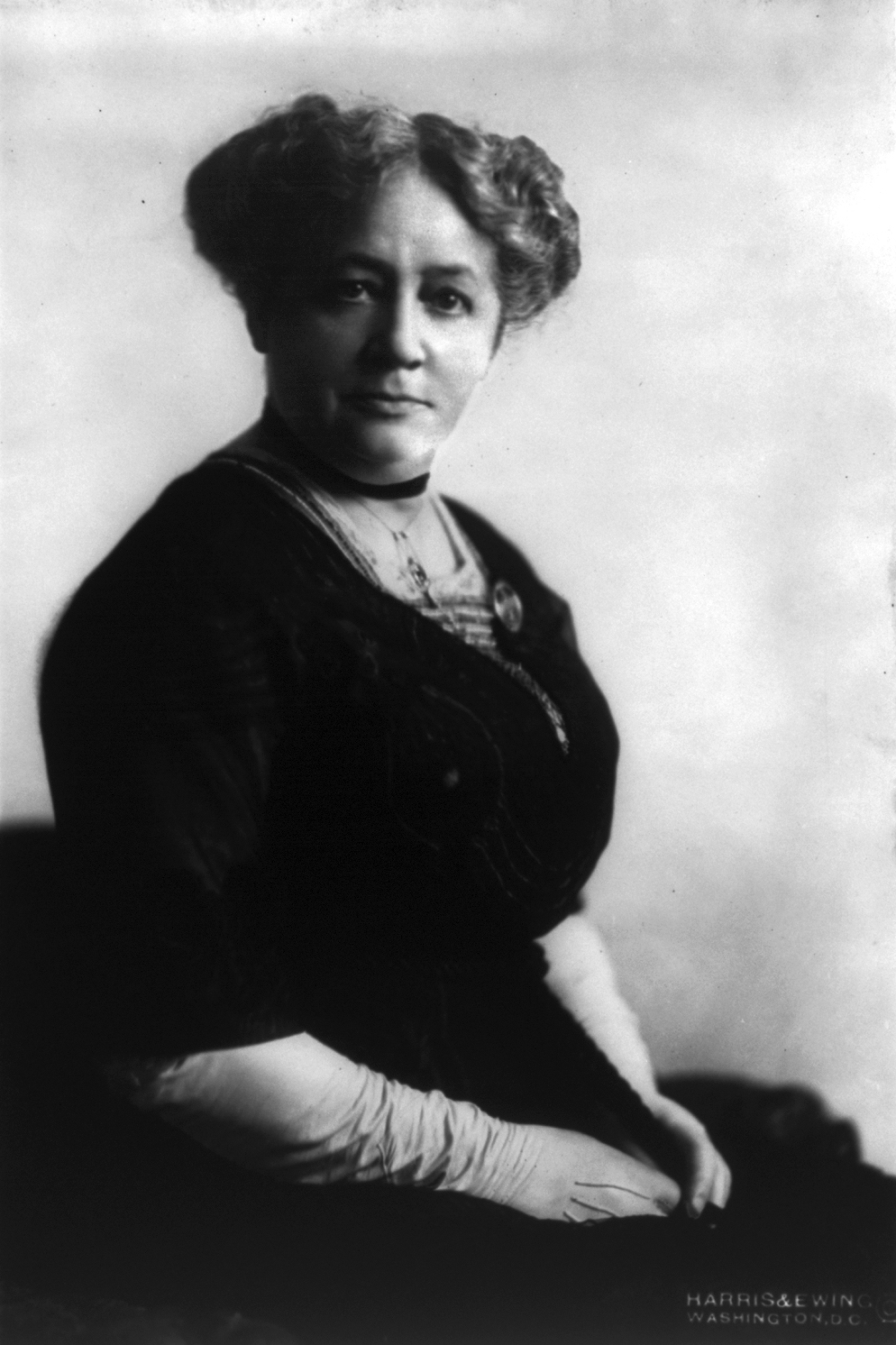
Attorney Mary Baird Bryan, the wife of William Jennings Bryan

After graduating from Whipple Academy, Bryan entered Illinois College, which was also located in Jacksonville. During his time at Illinois College, Bryan served as chaplain of the Sigma Pi literary society. He also continued to hone his public speaking skills, taking part in numerous debates and oratorical contests. Bryan graduated from Illinois College in 1881 at the top of his class. In 1879, while still in college, Bryan met Mary Elizabeth Baird, the daughter of an owner of a nearby general store, and began courting her. Bryan and Mary Elizabeth married on October 1, 1884. Mary Elizabeth would emerge as an important part of Bryan's career by managing his correspondence and helping him prepare speeches and articles.

Bryan then studied law in Chicago at Union Law College (now Northwestern University School of Law). While attending law school, Bryan worked for the attorney Lyman Trumbull, a former senator and friend of Silas Bryan who would serve as an important political ally to the younger Bryan until his death in 1896. Bryan graduated from law school in 1883 with a Bachelor of Laws and returned to Jacksonville to take a position with a local law firm. Frustrated by the lack of political and economic opportunities in Jacksonville, Bryan and his wife moved west to Lincoln in 1887, the capital of the fast-growing state of Nebraska.

== Early political career ==
=== U. S. Representative and Senate campaign ===
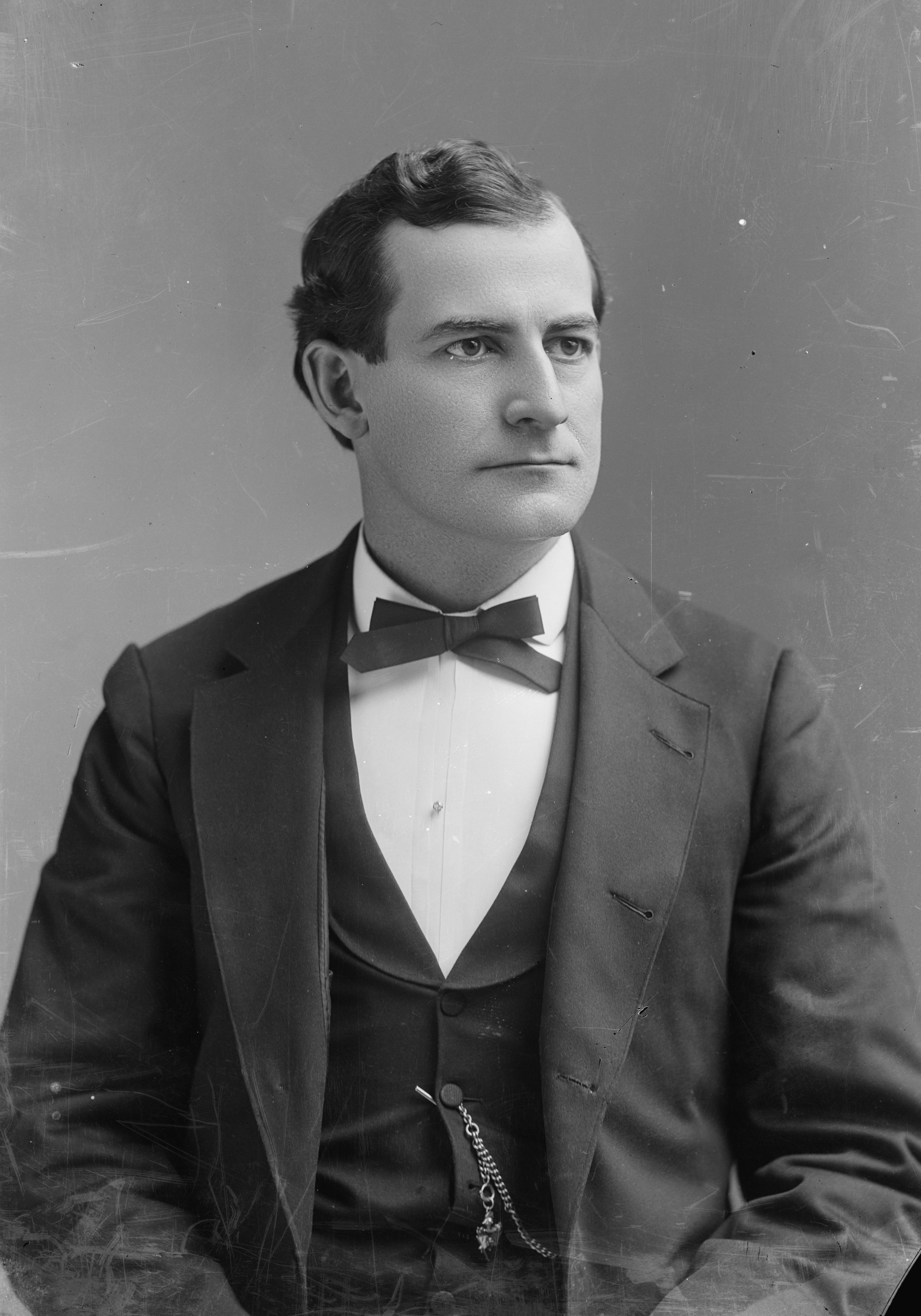
Portrait by C. M. Bell c. 1891–1894

Bryan established a successful legal practice in Lincoln with partner Adolphus Talbot, a Republican whom Bryan had known in law school. Bryan also entered local politics by campaigning for Democrats like Julius Sterling Morton and Grover Cleveland. After earning notoriety for his effective speeches in 1888, Bryan ran for Congress in the 1890 election. Bryan called for a reduction in tariff rates, the coinage of silver at a ratio equal to that of gold and action to stem the power of trusts. In part because of a series of strong debate performances, Bryan defeated incumbent Republican William James Connell, who had campaigned on the orthodox Republican platform, centered around the protective tariff. Bryan's victory made him only the second Democrat who ever represented Nebraska in Congress. Nationwide, Democrats picked up 76 seats in the House and so obtained a majority in that chamber. The Populist Party, a third party that drew support from agrarian voters in the West, also won several seats in Congress.

With the help of Representative William McKendree Springer, Bryan secured a coveted spot on the House Ways and Means Committee. He quickly earned a reputation as a talented orator and set out to gain a strong understanding of the key economic issues of the day. During the Gilded Age, the Democratic Party had begun to separate into two groups. The conservative northern "Bourbon Democrats", along with some allies in the South, sought to limit the size and power of the federal government. Another group of Democrats, drawing its membership largely from the agrarian movements of the South and West, favored greater federal intervention to help farmers, regulate railroads, and limit the power of large corporations. Bryan became affiliated with the latter group and advocated for the free coinage of silver ("free silver") and the establishment of a progressive federal income tax. That endeared him to many reformers, but Bryan's call for free silver cost him the support of Morton and some other conservative Nebraska Democrats. Free silver advocates were opposed by banks and bondholders who feared the effects of inflation.

Bryan sought re-election in 1892 to his house seat with the support of many Populists and backed the Populist presidential candidate James B. Weaver over the Democratic presidential candidate, Grover Cleveland. Bryan won re-election by just 140 votes, and Cleveland defeated Weaver and incumbent Republican President Benjamin Harrison in the 1892 presidential election. Cleveland appointed a cabinet consisting largely of conservative Democrats like Morton, who became Cleveland's secretary of agriculture. Shortly after Cleveland had taken office, a series of bank closures brought on the Panic of 1893, a major economic crisis. In response, Cleveland called a special session of Congress to call for the repeal of the 1890 Sherman Silver Purchase Act, which required the federal government to purchase several million ounces of silver every month. Bryan mounted a campaign to save the Sherman Silver Purchase Act, but a coalition of Republicans and Democrats successfully repealed it. Bryan, however, was successful in passing an amendment that provided for the establishment of the first peacetime federal income tax. (Note: The tax would be struck down by the Supreme Court in the 1895 case of Pollock v. Farmers' Loan & Trust Co..)

As the economy declined after 1893, the reforms favored by Bryan and the Populists became more popular among many voters. Rather than running for re-election in 1894, Bryan sought election to the United States Senate. He also became the editor-in-chief of the Omaha World-Herald although most editorial duties were performed by Richard Lee Metcalfe and Gilbert Hitchcock. Nationwide, the Republican Party won a huge victory in the elections of 1894 by gaining over 120 seats in the U.S. House of Representatives. In Nebraska, despite Bryan's popularity, the Republicans elected a majority of the state legislators, and Bryan lost the Senate election to Republican John Mellen Thurston. (Note: U.S. senators were elected by state legislatures before to the ratification of the Seventeenth Amendment in 1913.) Bryan, nonetheless, was pleased with the result of the 1894 election, as the Cleveland wing of the Democratic Party had been discredited, and Bryan's preferred gubernatorial candidate, Silas A. Holcomb, had been elected by a coalition of Democrats and Populists.

After the 1894 elections, Bryan embarked on a nationwide speaking tour designed to boost free silver, move his party away from the conservative policies of the Cleveland administration, lure Populists and free silver Republicans into the Democratic Party, and raise Bryan's public profile before the next election. Speaking fees allowed Bryan to give up his legal practice and devote himself full-time to oratory.

== Presidential candidate and party leader ==
=== Presidential election of 1896 ===
==== Democratic nomination ====
The Cross of Gold speech (excerpt)

If they dare to come out in the open field and defend the gold standard as a good thing, we shall fight them to the uttermost, having behind us the producing masses of the nation and the world. Having behind us the commercial interests and the laboring interests and all the toiling masses, we shall answer their demands for a gold standard by saying to them, you shall not press down upon the brow of labor this crown of thorns. You shall not crucify mankind upon a cross of gold.

By 1896, free silver forces were ascendant within the party. Though many Democratic leaders were not as enthusiastic about free silver as Bryan was, most recognized the need to distance the party from the unpopular policies of the Cleveland administration. By the start of the 1896 Democratic National Convention, Representative Richard P. Bland, a long-time champion of free silver, was widely perceived to be the frontrunner for the party's presidential nomination. Bryan hoped to offer himself as a presidential candidate, but his youth and relative inexperience gave him a lower profile than veteran Democrats like Bland, Governor Horace Boies of Iowa, and Vice President Adlai Stevenson. The free silver forces quickly established dominance over the convention, and Bryan helped draft a party platform that repudiated Cleveland, attacked the conservative rulings of the Supreme Court, and called the gold standard "not only un-American but anti-American".

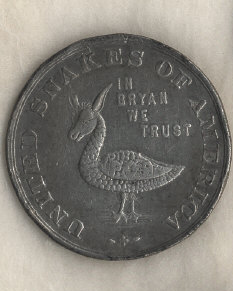
"UNITED SNAKES OF AMERICA" "IN BRYAN WE TRUST" political satire token of 1896, known as "Bryan Money"

Conservative Democrats demanded a debate on the party platform, and on the third day of the convention, each side put forth speakers to debate free silver and the gold standard. Bryan and Senator Benjamin Tillman of South Carolina were chosen as the speakers who would advocate for free silver, but Tillman's speech was poorly received by delegates from outside the South because of its sectionalism and references to the Civil War. Charged with delivering the convention's last speech on the topic of monetary policy, Bryan seized his opportunity to emerge as the nation's leading Democrat. In his "Cross of Gold" speech, Bryan argued that the debate over monetary policy was part of a broader struggle for democracy, political independence and the welfare of the "common man". Bryan's speech was met with rapturous applause and a celebration on the floor of the convention that lasted for over half an hour.

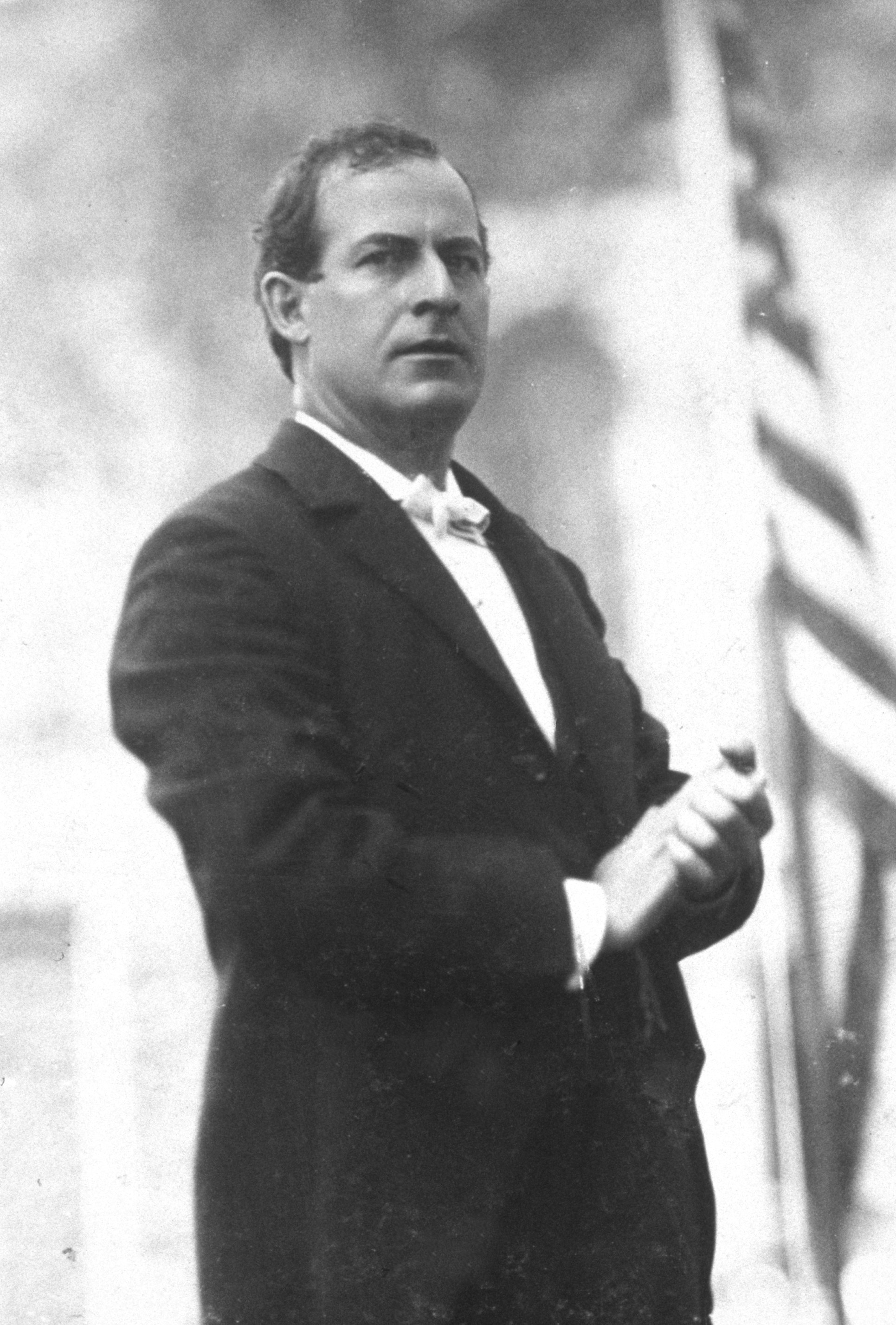
Bryan campaigning for president, October 1896

The next day, the Democratic Party held its presidential ballot. With the continuing support of Governor John Altgeld of Illinois, Bland led the first ballot of the convention, but he fell far short of the necessary two-thirds vote. Bryan finished in a distant second on the convention's first ballot, but his Cross of Gold speech had left a strong impression on many delegates. Despite the distrust of party leaders like Altgeld, who was wary of supporting an untested candidate, Bryan's strength grew over the next four ballots. He gained the lead on the fourth ballot and won his party's presidential nomination on the fifth ballot. At the age of 36, Bryan became the youngest presidential nominee of a major party in American history, a position that he still holds. The convention nominated Arthur Sewall, a wealthy Maine shipbuilder who also favored free silver and the income tax, as Bryan's running mate.

==== General election ====
Conservative Democrats, known as the "Gold Democrats", nominated a separate ticket. Cleveland himself did not publicly attack Bryan but privately favored the Republican candidate, William McKinley, over Bryan. Many urban newspapers in the Northeast and Midwest that had supported previous Democratic tickets also opposed Bryan's candidacy. Bryan, however, won the support of the Populist Party, which nominated a ticket consisting of Bryan and Thomas E. Watson of Georgia. Though Populist leaders feared that the nomination of the Democratic candidate would damage the party in the long term, they shared many of Bryan's political views and had developed a productive working relationship with Bryan.

The Republican campaign painted McKinley as the "advance agent of prosperity" and social harmony and warned of the supposed dangers of electing Bryan. McKinley and his campaign manager, Mark Hanna, knew that McKinley could not match Bryan's oratorical skills. Rather than giving speeches on the campaign trail, the Republican nominee conducted a front porch campaign. Hanna, meanwhile, raised an unprecedented amount of money, dispatched campaign surrogates and organized the distribution of millions of pieces of campaign literature.

1896 electoral vote results

Facing a huge campaign finance disadvantage, the Democratic campaign relied largely on Bryan's oratorical abilities. Breaking with the precedent set by most major party nominees, Bryan gave some 600 speeches, primarily in the hotly-contested Midwest. Bryan invented the national stumping tour, reaching an audience of 5 million in 27 states. He was building a coalition of the white South, poor northern farmers and industrial workers and silver miners against banks and railroads and the "money power". Free silver appealed to farmers, who would be paid more for their products, but not to industrial workers, who would not get higher wages but would pay higher prices. The industrial cities voted for McKinley, who won nearly the entire East and industrial Midwest and did well along the border and the West Coast. Bryan swept the South and Mountain states and the wheat growing regions of the Midwest. Revivalistic Protestants cheered at Bryan's semi-religious rhetoric. Ethnic voters supported McKinley, who promised they would not be excluded from the new prosperity, as did more prosperous farmers and the fast-growing middle class.

McKinley won the election by a fairly comfortable margin by taking 51 percent of the popular vote and 271 electoral votes. Democrats remained loyal to their champion after his defeat; many letters urged him to run again in the 1900 presidential election. William's younger brother, Charles W. Bryan, created a card file of supporters to whom the Bryans would send regular mailings to for the next 30 years. The Populist Party fractured after the election; many Populists, including James Weaver, followed Bryan into the Democratic Party, and others followed Eugene V. Debs into the Socialist Party.

1896 United States presidential election
Party	Candidate	Votes	Percentage	Electoral votes
Republican	William McKinley	7,108,480	50.99%	271
Democratic	William Jennings Bryan	5,588,462	40.09%	
Populist	William Jennings Bryan	907,717	6.51%	
Silver	William Jennings Bryan	12,873	0.09%	
Total	William Jennings Bryan	6,509,052	46.69%	176
National Democratic	John Palmer	134,645	0.97%	0
Prohibition	Joshua Levering	131,312	0.94%	0
Socialist Labor	Charles Matchett	36,373	0.26%	0
National Prohibition	Charles Bentley	19,367	0.14%	0
No party	Write-ins	1,570	0.01%	0
Totals		13,940,799	100.00%	447

=== War and peace: 1898–1900 ===
==== Spanish–American War ====
Because of better economic conditions for farmers and the effects of the Klondike Gold Rush in raising prices, free silver lost its potency as an electoral issue in the years after 1896. In 1900, President McKinley signed the Gold Standard Act, which put the United States on the gold standard. Bryan remained popular in the Democratic Party and his supporters took control of party organizations throughout the country, but he initially resisted shifting his political focus from free silver. Foreign policy emerged as an important issue due to the ongoing Cuban War of Independence against Spain, as Bryan and many Americans supported Cuban independence. After the explosion of the USS Maine in Havana Harbor, the United States declared war on Spain in April 1898, which began the Spanish–American War. Though wary of militarism, Bryan had long favored Cuban independence and so supported the war. He argued that "universal peace cannot come until justice is enthroned throughout the world. Until the right has triumphed in every land and love reigns in every heart, government must, as a last resort, appeal to force."

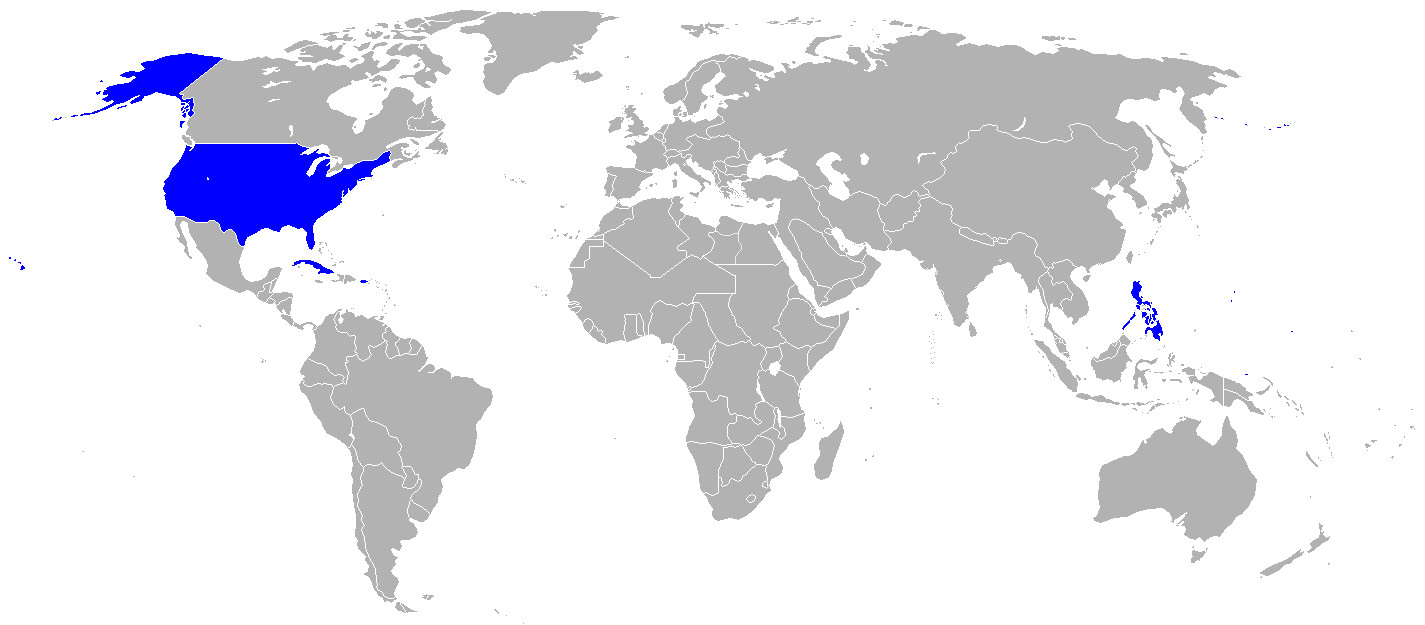
The United States and its colonial possessions after the Spanish–American War

At Governor Silas A. Holcomb's request, Bryan recruited a 2000-man regiment for the Nebraska National Guard and the soldiers of the regiment elected Bryan as their leader. Under Colonel Bryan's command, the regiment was transported to Camp Cuba Libre in Florida, but the fighting between Spain and the United States ended before the regiment had been deployed to Cuba. Bryan's regiment remained in Florida for months after the end of the war, which prevented Bryan from taking an active role in the 1898 midterm elections. Bryan resigned his commission and left Florida in December 1898 after the United States and Spain had signed the Treaty of Paris.

Bryan had supported the war to gain Cuba's independence, but he was outraged that the Treaty of Paris granted the United States control over the Philippines. Many Republicans believed that the United States had an obligation to "civilize" the Philippines, but Bryan strongly opposed what he saw as American imperialism. Despite his opposition to the annexation of the Philippines, Bryan urged his supporters to ratify the Treaty of Paris. He wanted to quickly bring an official end to the war and then to grant independence to the Philippines as soon as possible. With Bryan's support, the treaty was ratified in a close vote, bringing an official end to the Spanish–American War. In early 1899, the Philippine–American War broke out as the established Philippine government, under the leadership of Emilio Aguinaldo, sought to stop the American invasion of the archipelago.

==== Presidential election of 1900 ====
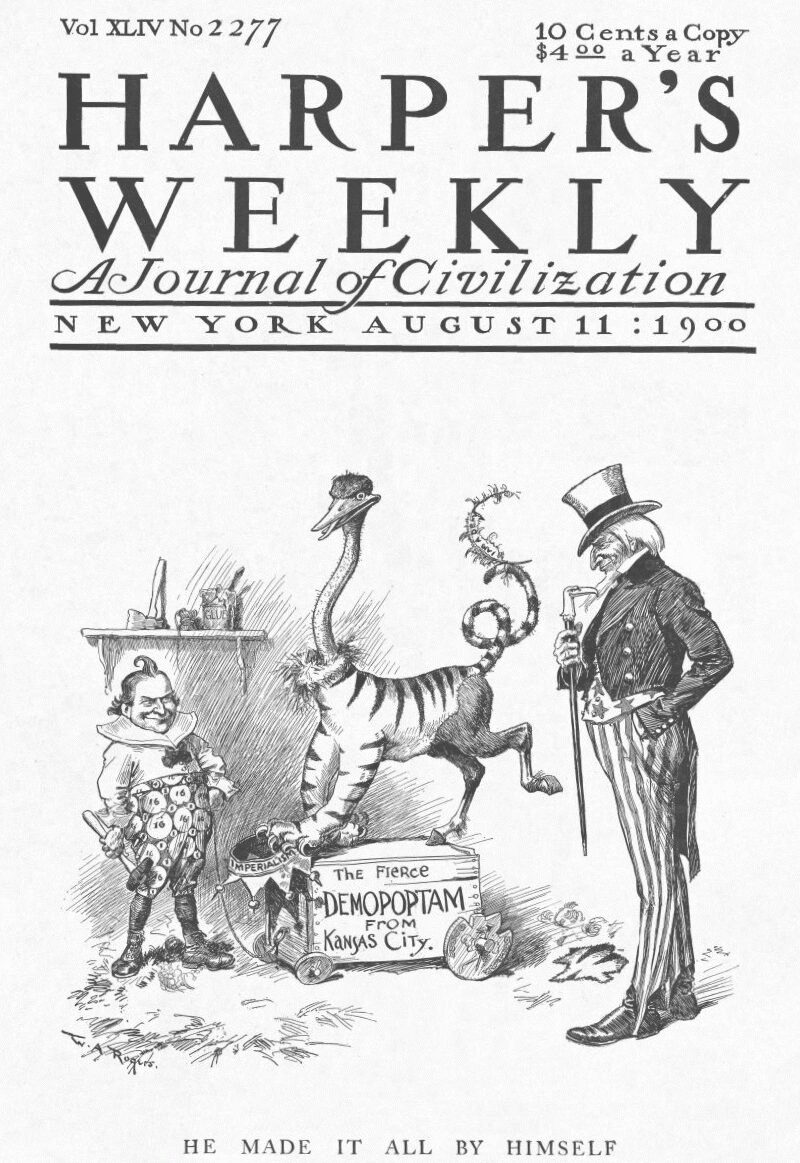
Conservatives in 1900 ridiculed Bryan's eclectic platform.

The 1900 Democratic National Convention met in Kansas City, Missouri, where some Democratic leaders opposed to Bryan had hoped to nominate Admiral George Dewey for president. Nevertheless, Bryan faced no significant opposition by the time of the convention and he won his party's nomination unanimously. Bryan did not attend the convention but exercised control of the convention's proceedings via telegraph. Bryan faced a decision regarding which issue his campaign would focus on. Many of his most fervent supporters wanted Bryan to continue his crusade for free silver, and Democrats from the Northeast advised Bryan to center his campaign on the growing power of trusts. Bryan, however, decided that his campaign would focus on anti-imperialism, partly to unite the factions of the party and win over some Republicans. The party platform contained planks supporting free silver and opposing the power of trusts, but imperialism was labeled as the "paramount issue" of the campaign. The party nominated former Vice President Adlai Stevenson to serve as Bryan's running mate.

In his speech accepting the Democratic nomination, Bryan argued that the election represented "a contest between democracy and plutocracy". He also strongly criticized the U.S. annexation of the Philippines and compared it to Britain's past rule over the Thirteen Colonies. Bryan argued that the United States should refrain from imperialism and should seek to become the "supreme moral factor in the world's progress and the accepted arbiter of the world's disputes". By 1900, the American Anti-Imperialist League, which included individuals like Benjamin Harrison, Andrew Carnegie, Carl Schurz and Mark Twain, had emerged as the primary domestic organization opposed to the continued American control of the Philippines. Many of the leaders of the League had opposed Bryan in 1896 and continued to distrust Bryan and his followers. Despite the distrust, Bryan's strong stance against imperialism convinced most of the league's leadership to throw their support behind the Democratic nominee.

1900 electoral vote results

Once again, the McKinley campaign established a massive financial advantage, and the Democratic campaign relied largely on Bryan's oratory. In a typical day Bryan gave four hour-long speeches and shorter talks that added up to 6 hours of speaking. At an average rate of 175 words a minute, he turned out 63,000 words a day, enough to fill 52 columns of a newspaper. The Republican Party's superior organization and finances boosted McKinley's candidacy and, as in the previous campaign, most major newspapers favored McKinley. Bryan also had to contend with the Republican vice presidential nominee, Theodore Roosevelt, who had emerged a national celebrity in the Spanish–American War and proved to be a strong public speaker. Bryan's anti-imperialism failed to register with many voters and as the campaign neared its end, Bryan increasingly shifted to attacks on corporate power. He once again sought the vote of urban laborers by telling them to vote against the business interests that had "condemn[ed] the boys of this country to perpetual clerkship".

By election day, few believed that Bryan would win, and McKinley ultimately prevailed once again over Bryan. Compared to the results of the 1896 election, McKinley increased his popular vote margin and picked up several Western states, including Bryan's home state of Nebraska. The Republican platform of victory in war and a strong economy proved to be more important to voters than Bryan's questioning the morality of annexing the Philippines. The election also confirmed the continuing organizational advantage of the Republican Party outside of the South.

=== Between presidential campaigns, 1901–1907 ===
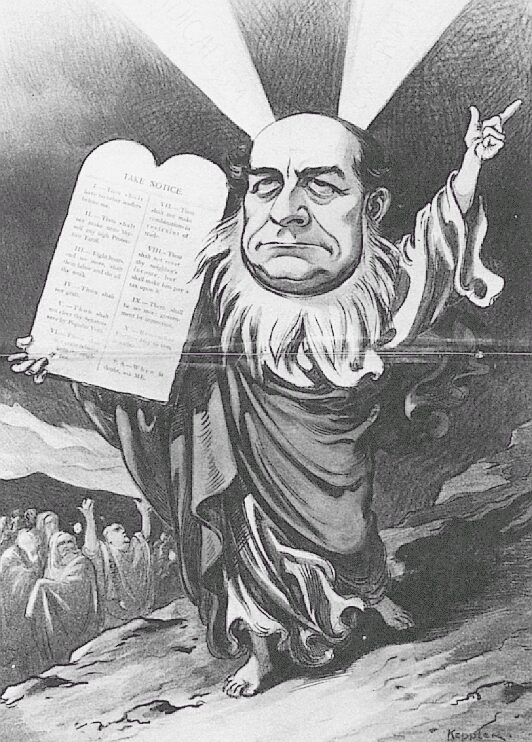
William J Bryan in 1906 as Moses with new 10 commandments; Puck September 19, 1906, by Joseph Keppler. Tablet reads: l-Thou shalt have no other leaders before me. II—Thou shalt not make unto thyself any high Protective Tariff. Ill—Eight hours, and no more, shalt thou labor and do all thy work. IV—Thou shalt not graft. V—Thou shalt not elect thy Senators save by Popular Vote. VI—Thou shalt not grant rebates unto thy neighbor. VII—Thou shalt not make combinations in restraint of trade. VIII—Thou shalt not covet thy neighbor's income, but shall make him pay a tax upon it. IX—There shall be no more government by injunction. X—Remember Election Day to vote it early. P.S.— When in doubt, ask Me.

After the election, Bryan returned to journalism and oratory and frequently appeared on the Chautauqua circuits to give well-attended lectures across the country. In January 1901, Bryan published the first issue of his weekly newspaper, The Commoner, which echoed his favorite political and religious themes. Bryan served as the editor and publisher of the newspaper; Charles Bryan, Mary Bryan and Richard Metcalfe also performed editorial duties when Bryan was traveling. The Commoner became one of the most widely-read newspapers of its era and boasted 145,000 subscribers approximately 5 years after its founding. Though the paper's subscriber base heavily overlapped with Bryan's political base in the Midwest, content from the papers was frequently reprinted by major newspapers in the Northeast. In 1902, Bryan, his wife and his three children moved into Fairview, a mansion located in Lincoln; Bryan referred to the house as the "Monticello of the West", and frequently invited politicians and diplomats to visit.

Bryan's defeat in 1900 cost him his status as the clear leader of the Democratic Party and conservatives such as David B. Hill and Arthur Pue Gorman moved to re-establish their control over the party and return it to the policies of the Cleveland era. Meanwhile, Roosevelt succeeded McKinley as president after the latter's assassination in September 1901 at the Pan-American Exposition, in Buffalo, New York. Roosevelt prosecuted antitrust cases and implemented other progressive policies, but Bryan argued that Roosevelt did not fully embrace progressive causes. Bryan called for a package of reforms, including a federal income tax, pure food and drug laws, a ban on corporate financing of campaigns, a constitutional amendment providing for the direct election of senators, local ownership of utilities, and the state adoption of the initiative and the referendum, and provisions for old age. He also criticized Roosevelt's foreign policy and attacked Roosevelt's decision to invite Booker T. Washington to dine at the White House in 1901.

Before the 1904 Democratic National Convention, Alton B. Parker, a New York and conservative ally of David Hill, was the frontrunner for the Democratic presidential nomination. Conservatives feared that Bryan would join with the publisher William Randolph Hearst to block Parker's nomination. Seeking to appease Bryan and other progressives, Hill agreed to a party platform that omitted mention of the gold standard and criticized trusts. In the event, Bryan did not support Parker or Hearst, but rather Francis Cockrell, a Missouri senator whose career had been almost wholly unremarkable. Bryan's motivation was not any belief that Cockrell could defeat Roosevelt in the election, but rather that he would lose decisively, thus paving the way for Bryan to be re-nominated in 1908. However, the possibility of Hearst getting the nomination alarmed the party's moderates enough that they moved to support Parker, who was narrowly nominated on the first ballot at the convention, with Cockrell finishing a distant third place. Bryan would nonetheless get his desired outcome when Roosevelt won by the biggest popular vote margin since James Monroe was re-elected without opposition in 1820. Afterwards, Bryan published a post-election edition of The Commoner that advised its readers: "Do not Compromise with Plutocracy".

Bryan traveled to Europe in 1903, meeting with figures such as Leo Tolstoy, who shared some of Bryan's religious and political views. In 1905, Bryan and his family embarked on a trip around the globe and visited eighteen countries in Asia and Europe. Bryan funded the trip with public speaking fees and a travelogue that was published on a weekly basis. Bryan's travels abroad were documented in a study called "The Old World and its Ways", in which he shared his thoughts on different topics such as those related to progressive politics and labor legislation. Bryan was greeted by a large crowd upon his return to the United States in 1906 and was widely seen as the likely 1908 Democratic presidential nominee. Partly due to the efforts of muckraking journalists, voters had become increasingly open to progressive ideas since 1904. President Roosevelt himself had moved to the left, favoring federal regulation of railroad rates and meatpacking plants. However, Bryan continued to favor more far-reaching reforms, including federal regulation of banks and securities, protections for union organizers and federal spending on highway construction and education. Bryan also briefly expressed support for the state and federal ownership of railroads in a manner similar to Germany but backed down from that policy in the face of an intra-party backlash.

=== Presidential election of 1908 ===
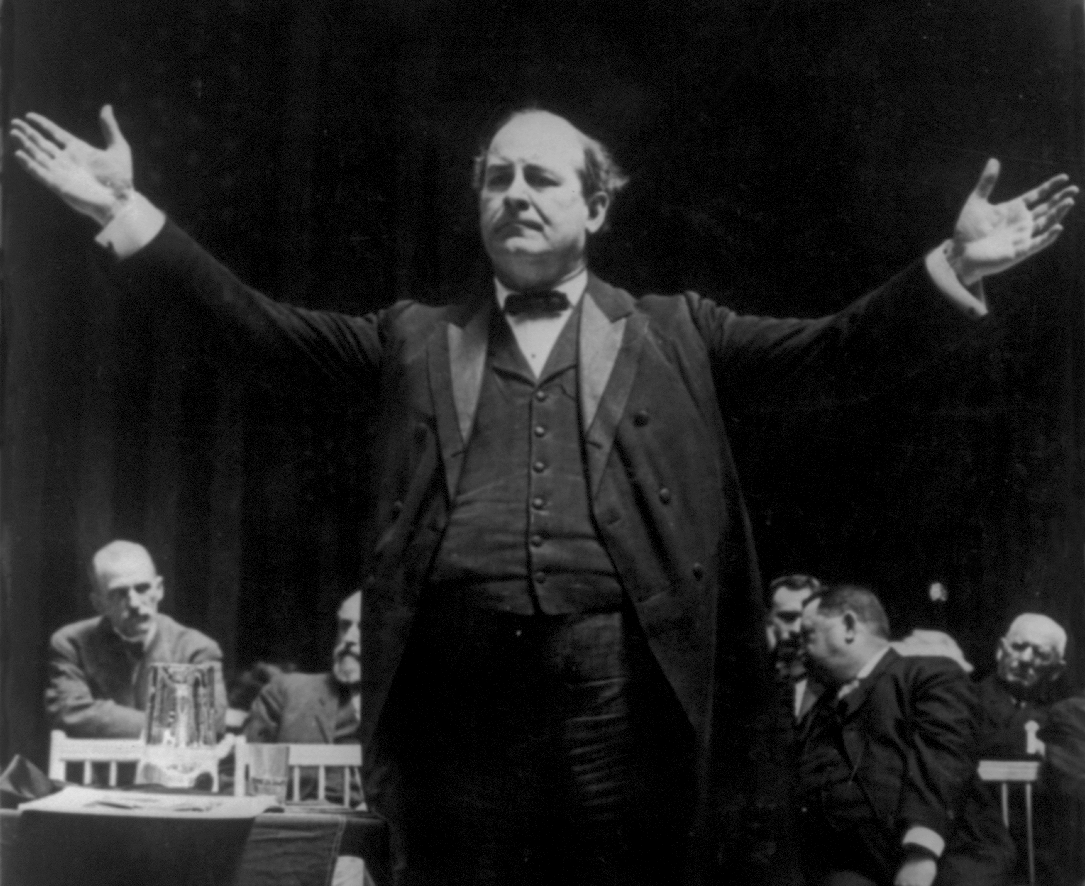
Bryan speaking at the 1908 Democratic National Convention

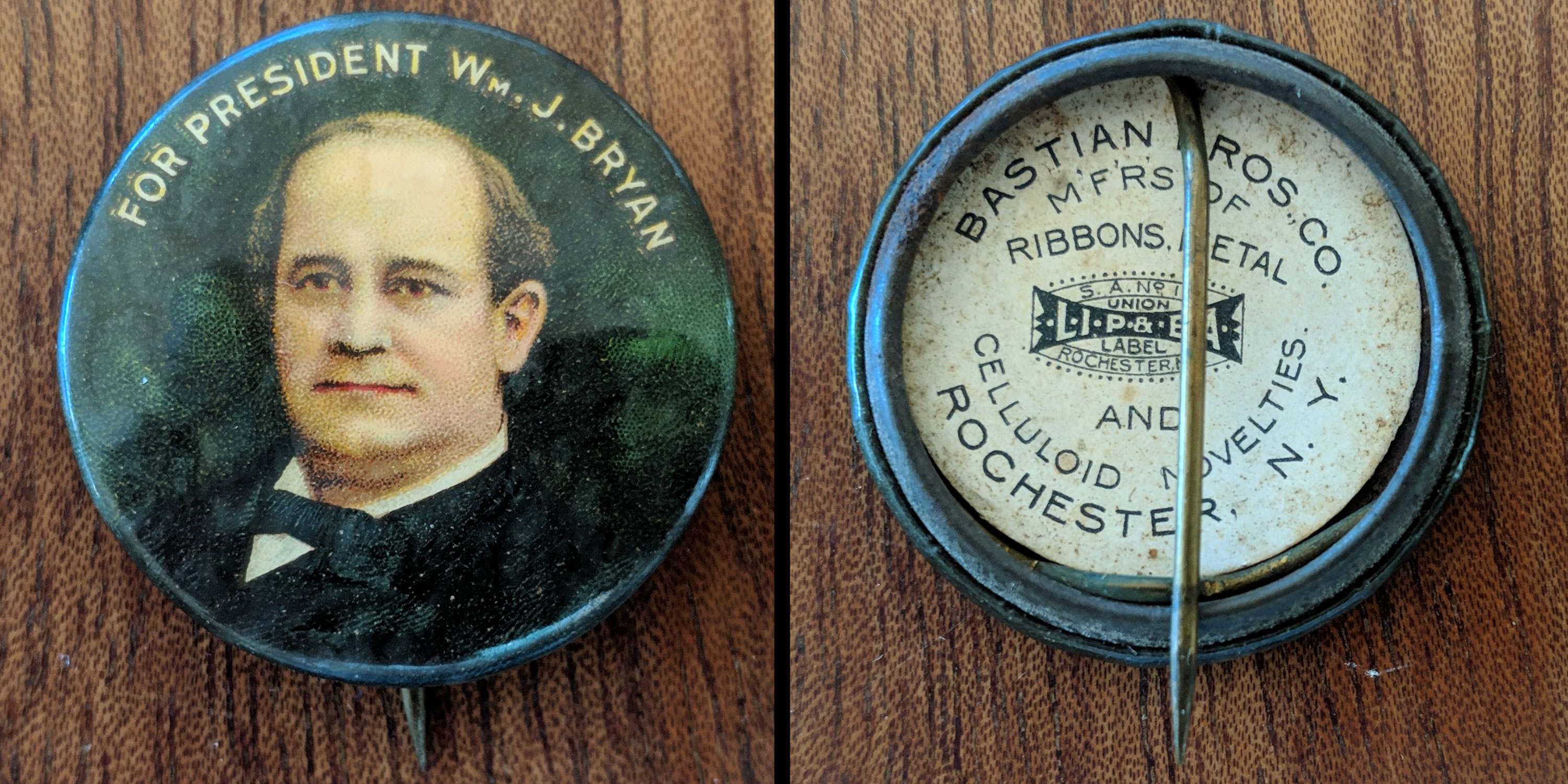
Presidential Campaign button for Bryan

Speech by Bryan on the railroad question, 1908

Roosevelt, who enjoyed wide popularity among most voters even while he alienated some corporate leaders, anointed Secretary of War William Howard Taft as his successor. Meanwhile, Bryan re-established his control over the Democratic Party and won the endorsement of numerous local and state organizations. Conservative Democrats again sought to prevent Bryan's nomination, but were unable to unite around an alternative candidate. Bryan was nominated for president on the first ballot of the 1908 Democratic National Convention. He was joined by John W. Kern, a former state senator from the swing state of Indiana.

Bryan campaigned on a party platform that reflected his long-held beliefs, but the Republican platform also advocated for progressive policies, which left relatively few major differences between the two major parties. One issue that the two parties differed on concerned deposit insurance, as Bryan favored requiring national banks to provide deposit insurance. Bryan largely unified the leaders of his own party and his pro-labor policies won him the first presidential endorsement ever issued by the American Federation of Labor. As in previous campaigns, Bryan embarked on a public speaking tour to boost his candidacy but was later joined on the trail by Taft.

Defying Bryan's confidence in his own victory, Taft decisively won the 1908 presidential election. Bryan won just a handful of states outside of the Solid South, as he failed to galvanize the support of urban laborers. Bryan remains the only individual since the Civil War to lose three separate U.S. presidential elections as a major party nominee. Since the ratification of the Twelfth Amendment, Bryan and Henry Clay are the lone individuals who received electoral votes in three separate presidential elections but lost all three elections. The 493 cumulative electoral votes cast for Bryan across three separate elections are the most received by a presidential candidate who was never elected.

1908 electoral vote results

Bryan remained an influential figure in Democratic politics, and after Democrats took control of the House of Representatives in the 1910 midterm elections, he appeared in the House of Representatives to argue for tariff reduction. In 1909, Bryan came out publicly for the first time in favor of Prohibition. A lifelong teetotaler, Bryan had refrained from embracing Prohibition earlier because of the issue's unpopularity among many Democrats. According to biographer Paolo Colletta, Bryan "sincerely believed that prohibition would contribute to the physical health and moral improvement of the individual, stimulate civic progress and end the notorious abuses connected with the liquor traffic".

In 1910, he also came out in favor of women's suffrage. Bryan crusaded as well for legislation to support the introduction of the initiative and referendum as a means of giving voters a direct voice while he made a whistle-stop campaign tour of Arkansas in 1910. Although some observers, including President Taft, speculated that Bryan would make a fourth run for the presidency, Bryan repeatedly denied that he had any such intention.

== Wilson presidency ==
=== 1912 election ===
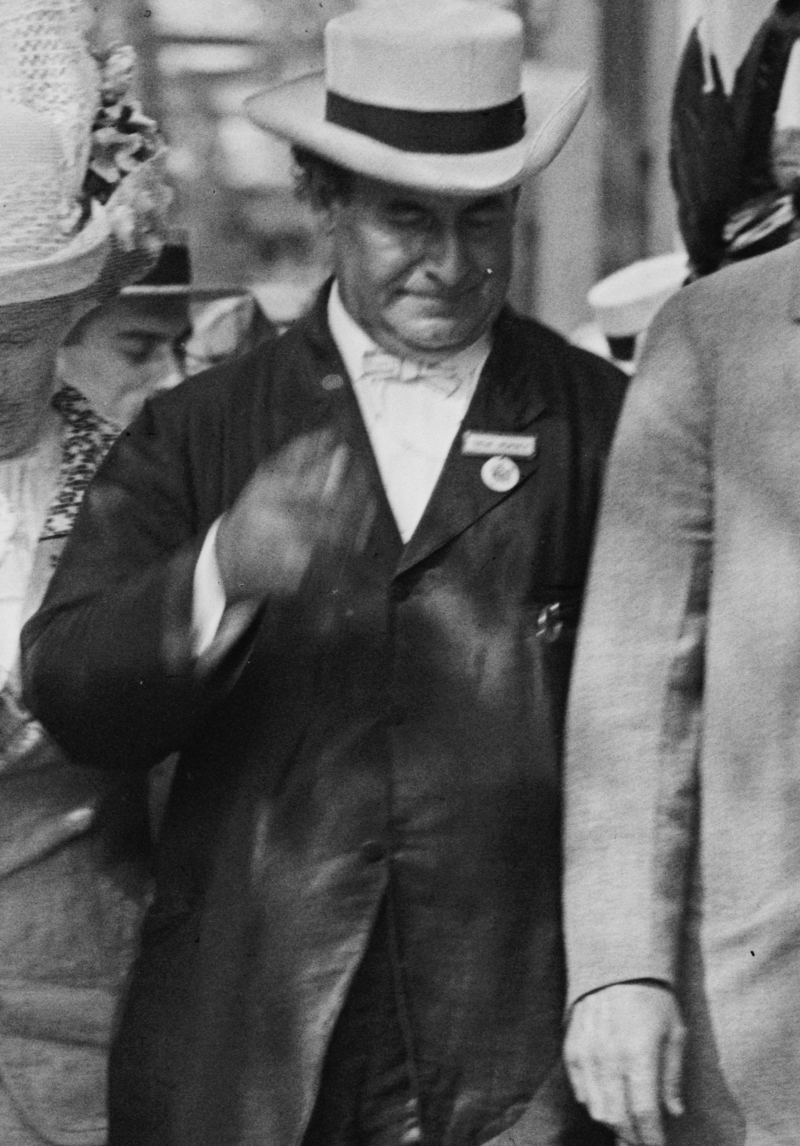
Bryan attending the 1912 Democratic National Convention

An escalating split in the Republican Party gave Democrats their best chance in decades to win the presidency. Bryan did not seek the Democratic presidential nomination; his continuing influence gave him a major voice in choosing the nominee. Bryan was intent on preventing the conservatives in the party from nominating their candidate, as they had done in 1904. For a mix of practical and ideological reasons, Bryan ruled out supporting the candidacies of Oscar Underwood, Judson Harmon, and Joseph W. Folk, which left two major candidates competing for his backing: New Jersey Governor Woodrow Wilson and Speaker of the House Champ Clark. As Speaker, Clark could lay claim to progressive accomplishments, including the passage of constitutional amendments providing for the direct election of senators and the establishment of a federal income tax. However, Clark had alienated Bryan for his failure to lower the tariff and Bryan viewed the Speaker as overly friendly to conservative business interests. Wilson had criticized Bryan but had compiled a strong progressive record as governor. As the 1912 Democratic National Convention approached, Bryan continued to deny that he would seek the presidency, but many journalists and politicians suspected that Bryan hoped a deadlocked convention would turn to him.

After the start of the convention, Bryan engineered the passage of a resolution stating that the party was "opposed to the nomination of any candidate who is a representative of, or under any obligation to, J. Pierpont Morgan, Thomas F. Ryan, August Belmont, or any other member of the privilege-hunting and favor-seeking class". Clark and Wilson won the support of most delegates on the first several presidential ballots of the Democratic convention, but each fell short of the necessary 2/3 majority. After Tammany Hall came out in favor of Clark and the New York delegation threw its support behind the Speaker, Bryan announced that he would support Wilson. In explaining his decision, Bryan stated that he could "not be a party to the nomination of any man... who will not, when elected, be absolutely free to carry out the anti-Morgan-Ryan-Belmont resolution". Bryan's speech marked the start of a long shift away from Clark: Wilson would finally clinch the presidential nomination after over 40 ballots. Journalists attributed much of the credit for Wilson's victory to Bryan.

In the 1912 presidential election, Wilson faced off against President Taft and former President Roosevelt, the latter of whom ran on the Progressive Party ticket. In an article defending the Democratic Party as a vehicle for progressive change, Bryan criticized certain aspects of the platform adopted by the Progressive Party, but praised its emphasis on social justice, arguing that

The planks in regard to the conservation of human resources will appeal to the public, especially those prohibiting child labor and excessive hours, and those demanding a day of rest each week, a living minimum wage, legislation for the prevention of accidents, for the abolition of convict contract labor, and for publicity in regard to labor conditions. The inheritance tax plank is also good, and the plan calling for greater safeguards for the prevention of monopoly of our natural resources.

Bryan campaigned throughout the West for Wilson and also offered advice to the Democratic nominee on various issues. The split in the Republican ranks helped give Wilson the presidency; he won over 400 electoral votes but only 41.8 percent of the popular vote. In the concurrent congressional elections, Democrats expanded their majority in the House and gained control of the Senate, which gave the party unified control of Congress and the presidency for the first time since the early 1890s.

=== Secretary of State ===
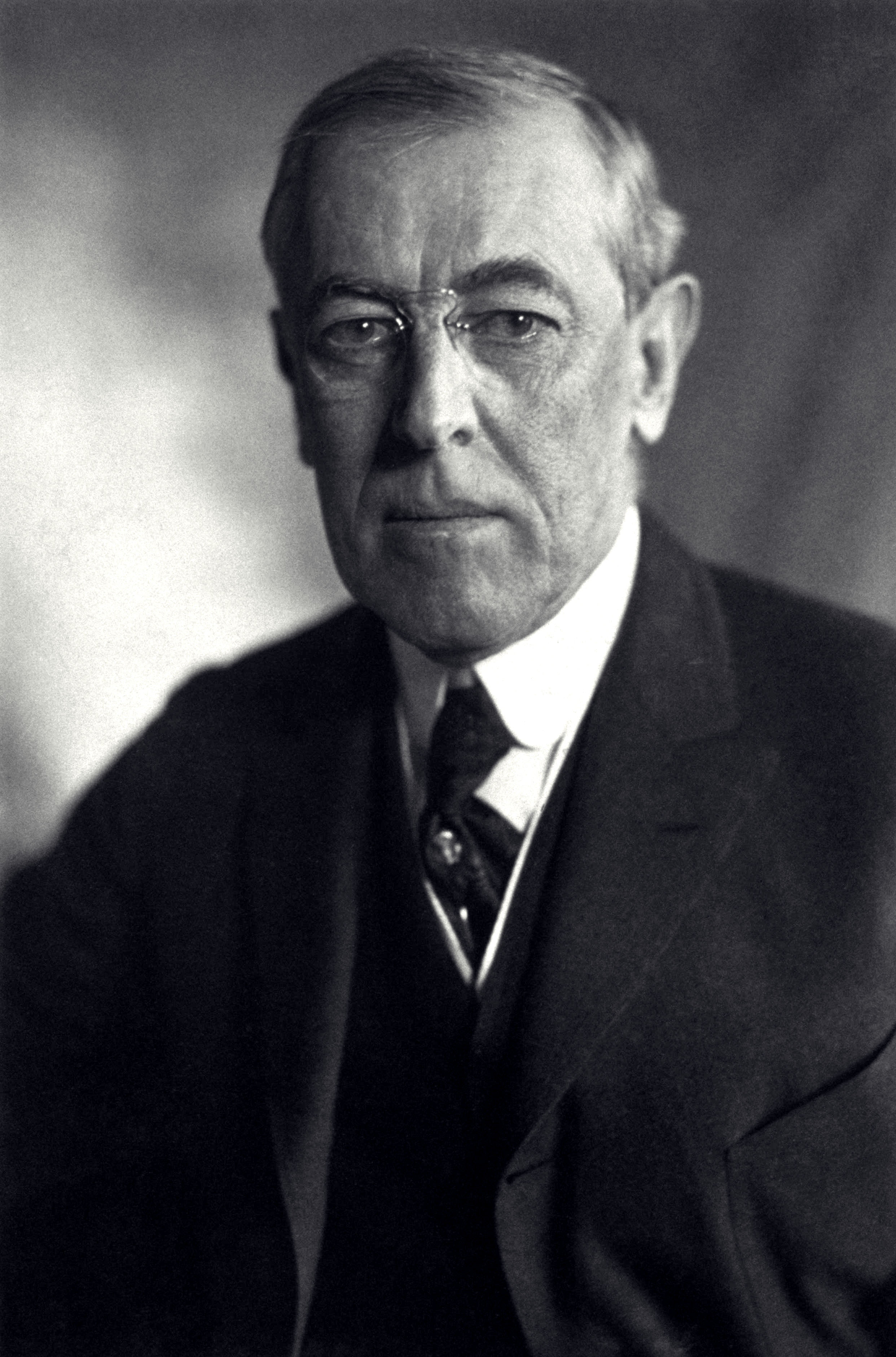
Bryan served as Secretary of State under President Woodrow Wilson.

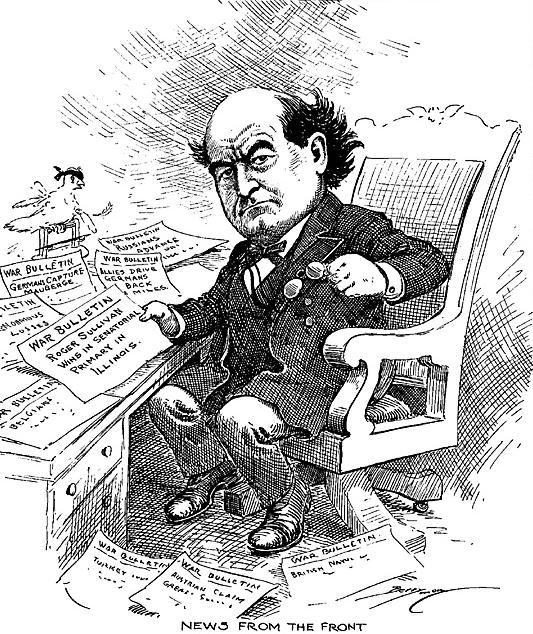
Cartoon of Secretary of State Bryan reading war news in 1914

President Wilson named Bryan as Secretary of State, the most prestigious appointive position. Bryan's extensive travels, popularity in the party, and support for Wilson in the election made him the obvious choice. Bryan took charge of a State Department that employed 150 officials in Washington and an additional 400 employees in embassies abroad. Early in Wilson's tenure, the president and the secretary of state broadly agreed on foreign policy goals, including the rejection of Taft's Dollar diplomacy. They also shared many priorities in domestic affairs and, with Bryan's help, Wilson orchestrated passage of laws that reduced tariff rates, imposed a progressive income tax, introduced new antitrust measures, and established the Federal Reserve System. Bryan proved particularly influential in ensuring that the president, rather than private bankers, was empowered to appoint the members of the Federal Reserve Board of Governors.

Secretary of State Bryan pursued a series of bilateral treaties that required both signatories to submit all disputes to an investigative tribunal. He quickly won approval from the president and the Senate to proceed with his initiative. In mid-1913, El Salvador became the first nation to sign one of Bryan's treaties, and 29 other countries, including every great power in Europe other than Germany and Austria-Hungary, also agreed to sign the treaties. Despite Bryan's stated aversion to conflict, he oversaw U.S. military interventions in Haiti, the Dominican Republic and Mexico as part of the Banana Wars.

After World War I broke out in Europe, Bryan consistently advocated for American neutrality between the Entente and the Central Powers. With Bryan's support, Wilson initially sought to stay out of the conflict, urging Americans to be "impartial in thought as well as action". For much of 1914, Bryan attempted to bring a negotiated end to the war, but the leaders of both the Entente and the Central Powers were ultimately uninterested in American mediation. Bryan remained firmly committed to neutrality, but Wilson and others within the administration became increasingly sympathetic to the Entente.

The March 1915 Thrasher incident, in which a German U-boat sank the British steamship Falaba with a U.S. citizen on board, provided a major blow to the cause of American neutrality. The May 1915 sinking of RMS Lusitania by another German U-boat further galvanized anti-German sentiment in the United States, as 128 Americans died in the incident. In response, Bryan argued that the Allied blockade of Germany was as offensive as the German U-boat campaign, and maintained that by traveling on British vessels "an American citizen can, by putting his own business above his regard for this country, assume for his own advantage unnecessary risks and thus involve his country in international complications". After Wilson sent an official message of protest to Germany and refused to warn Americans publicly not to travel on British ships, Bryan delivered his letter of resignation to Wilson on June 8, 1915.

== Later career ==
=== Political involvement ===
During the 1916 presidential election, members of the Prohibition Party attempted to place Bryan into consideration for its presidential nomination, but he rejected the offer via telegram.

Bryan supported Wilson's 1916 re-election campaign. Bryan did not attend as an official delegate, but the 1916 Democratic National Convention suspended its own rules to allow Bryan to address the convention; Bryan delivered a well-received speech that strongly defended Wilson's domestic record. Bryan served as a campaign surrogate for Wilson by delivering dozens of speeches, primarily to audiences west of the Mississippi River. Ultimately, Wilson narrowly prevailed over the Republican candidate, Charles Evans Hughes. When the United States entered World War I in April 1917, Bryan wrote to Wilson: "Believing it to be the duty of the citizen to bear his part of the burden of war and his share of the peril, I hereby tender my services to the Government. Please enroll me as a private whenever I am needed and assign me to any work that I can do." Wilson declined to appoint Bryan to a federal position, but Bryan agreed to Wilson's request to provide public support for the war effort through his speeches and articles. After the war, despite some reservations, Bryan supported Wilson's unsuccessful effort to bring the United States into the League of Nations.

=== Crusade for Prohibition ===
After leaving office, Bryan spent much of his time advocating for the eight-hour day, a minimum wage, the right of unions to strike and increasingly women's suffrage. However, his main crusades focused on support for prohibition and opposition to the teaching of evolution. Congress passed the 18th Amendment, which provided for nationwide Prohibition, in 1917. Two years later, Congress passed the 19th Amendment, which granted women the right to vote nationwide. Both amendments were ratified in 1920. In 1916, Bryan expressed his belief to John Reed that the government "may properly impose a minimum wage, regulate hours of labor, pass usury laws, and enforce inspection of food, sanitation and housing conditions." During the 1920s, Bryan called for further reforms, including agricultural subsidies, the guarantee of a living wage, full public financing of political campaigns and an end to legal gender discrimination.

Some Prohibitionists and other Bryan supporters tried to convince the three-time presidential candidate to enter the 1920 presidential election, and a Literary Digest poll taken in mid-1920 ranked Bryan as the fourth-most popular potential Democratic candidate. Bryan, however, declined to seek public office and wrote, "if I can help this world to banish alcohol and after that to banish war... no office, no Presidency, can offer the honors that will be mine". He attended the 1920 Democratic National Convention as a delegate from Nebraska but was disappointed by the nomination of Governor James M. Cox, who had not supported ratification of the 18th Amendment. Bryan declined the presidential nomination of the Prohibition Party and refused to campaign for Cox, which made the 1920 campaign the first presidential contest in over 30 years in which he did not actively campaign.

Though he became less involved in Democratic politics after 1920, Bryan attended the 1924 Democratic National Convention as a delegate from Florida. He helped defeat a resolution condemning the Ku Klux Klan because he expected that the organization would soon fold. Bryan disliked the Klan but never publicly attacked it. He also strongly opposed the candidacy of Al Smith due to Smith's hostility towards Prohibition. After over 100 ballots, the Democratic convention nominated John W. Davis, a conservative Wall Street lawyer. To balance the conservative Davis with a progressive, the convention nominated Bryan's brother, Charles W. Bryan, for vice president. Bryan was disappointed by the nomination of Davis but strongly approved of the nomination of his brother and he delivered numerous campaign speeches in support of the Democratic ticket. Davis suffered one of the worst losses in the Democratic Party's history, taking just 29 percent of the vote against Republican President Calvin Coolidge and the third-party candidate Robert M. La Follette.

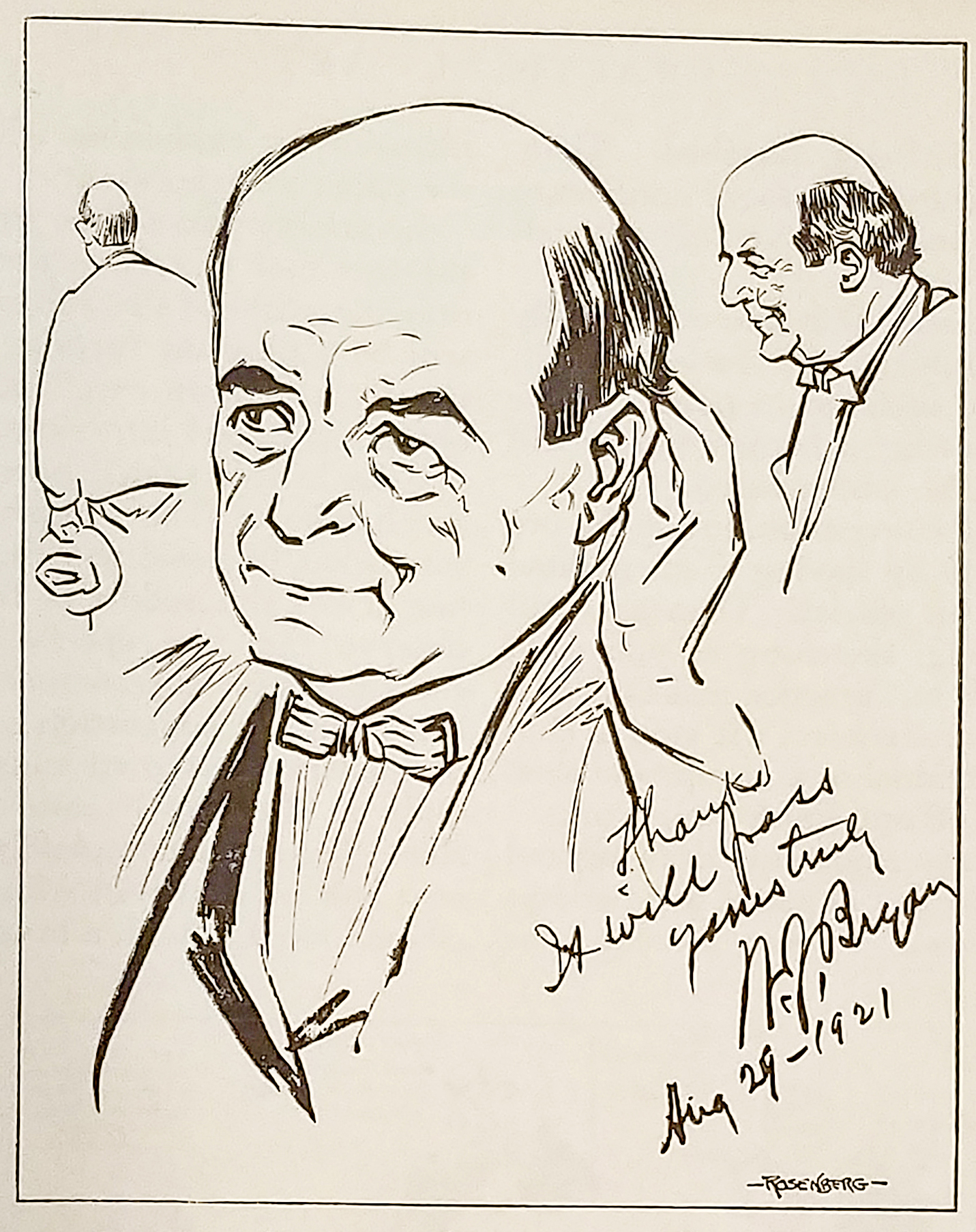
William Jennings Bryan autographed drawing by Manuel Rosenberg, 1921

=== Florida real estate promoter ===
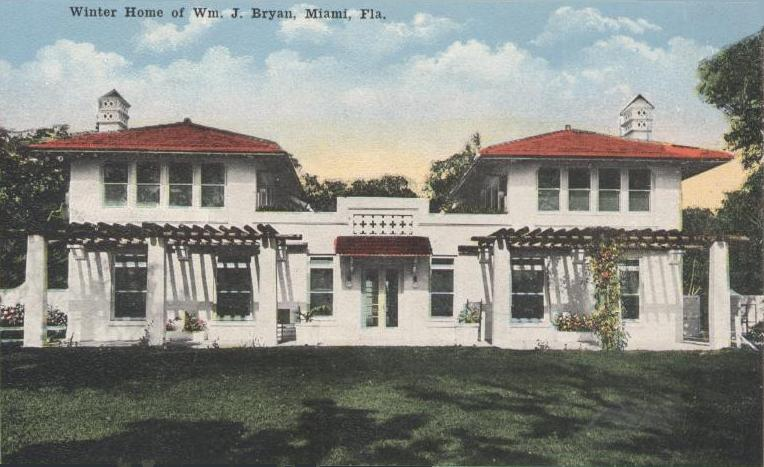
Villa Serena, Bryan's home built in 1913 in Miami, Florida

To help Mary cope with her worsening health during the harsh winters of Nebraska, the Bryans bought a farm in Mission, Texas, in 1909. Due to Mary's arthritis the Bryans in 1912 began to build a new home in Miami, Florida, known as Villa Serena. The Bryans made Villa Serena their permanent home, and Charles Bryan continued to oversee The Commoner from Lincoln. The Bryans were active citizens in Miami, leading a fundraising drive for the YMCA and frequently hosting the public at their home. Bryan undertook lucrative speaking engagements, often serving as a spokesman for George E. Merrick's new planned community of Coral Gables.

=== Trustee of American University ===
Bryan served as a member of the board of trustees at American University in Washington, D.C., from 1914 to his death. For some of these years, he served concurrently with Warren G. Harding and Theodore Roosevelt.

=== Anti-evolution activism ===
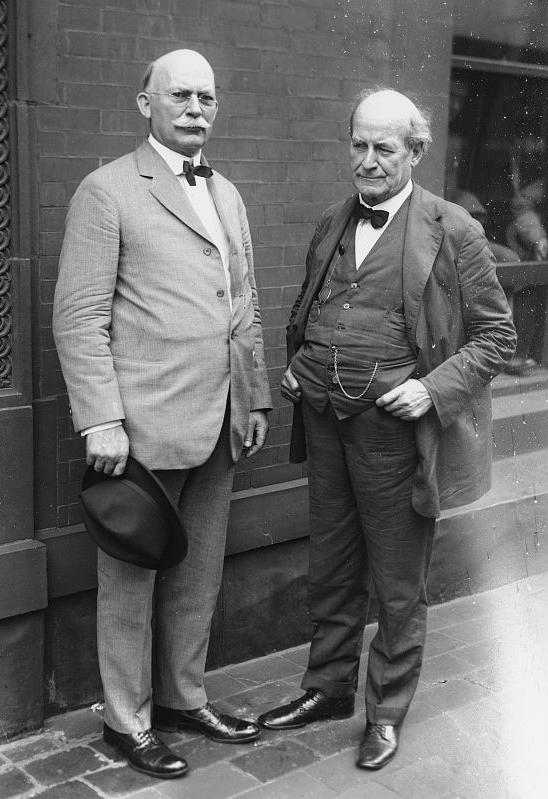
William J. Bryan (right) with his younger brother Charles W.

In the 1920s, Bryan shifted his focus away from politics, becoming one of the most prominent religious figures in the country. He held a weekly Bible class in Miami and published several religiously themed books. He was one of the first individuals to preach religious faith on the radio, which let him reach audiences across the country. Bryan welcomed the proliferation of faiths other than Protestant Christianity, but he was deeply concerned by the rejection of Biblical literalism by many Protestants. According to the historian Ronald L. Numbers, Bryan was not nearly as much a fundamentalist as many modern-day creationists of the 21st century. Instead, he is more accurately described as a "day-age creationist". Bradley J. Longfield posits Bryan was a "theologically conservative Social Gospeler".

In the final years of his life, Bryan became the unofficial leader of a movement that sought to prevent public schools from teaching Charles Darwin's theory of evolution. Bryan had long expressed skepticism and concern regarding Darwin's theory; in his famous 1909 Chautauqua lecture, "The Prince of Peace", Bryan had warned that the theory of evolution could undermine the foundations of morality. Bryan opposed Darwin's theory of evolution through natural selection for two reasons. He believed what he considered a materialistic account of the descent of man (and all life) through evolution to be directly contrary to the Biblical creation account. Also, he considered Darwinism as applied to society (social Darwinism) to be a great evil force in the world by promoting hatred and conflicts and inhibiting upward social and economic mobility of the poor and oppressed.

As part of his crusade against Darwinism, Bryan called for state and local laws banning public schools from teaching evolution. He requested that lawmakers refrain from attaching a criminal penalty to the anti-evolution laws and also urged that educators be allowed to teach evolution as a "hypothesis", rather than as a fact. Only five southern states responded to Bryan's call to bar the teaching of evolution in public schools.

Bryan was worried that the theory of evolution was gaining ground not only in the universities, but also within the church. The developments of 19th century liberal theology, specifically higher criticism, had allowed many clergymen to be willing to embrace the theory of evolution and claim that it was not contradictory to Christianity. Determined to put an end to this, Bryan, who had long served as a Presbyterian elder, decided to run for the position of Moderator of the General Assembly of the Presbyterian Church in the United States of America, which was at the time embroiled in the Fundamentalist–Modernist Controversy. Bryan's main competition in the race was the Rev. Charles F. Wishart, president of the College of Wooster in Ohio, who had loudly endorsed the teaching of the theory of evolution in the college. Bryan lost to Wishart by a vote of 451–427. Bryan failed in gaining approval for a proposal to cut off funds to schools in which the theory of evolution was taught.

==== Scopes trial ====
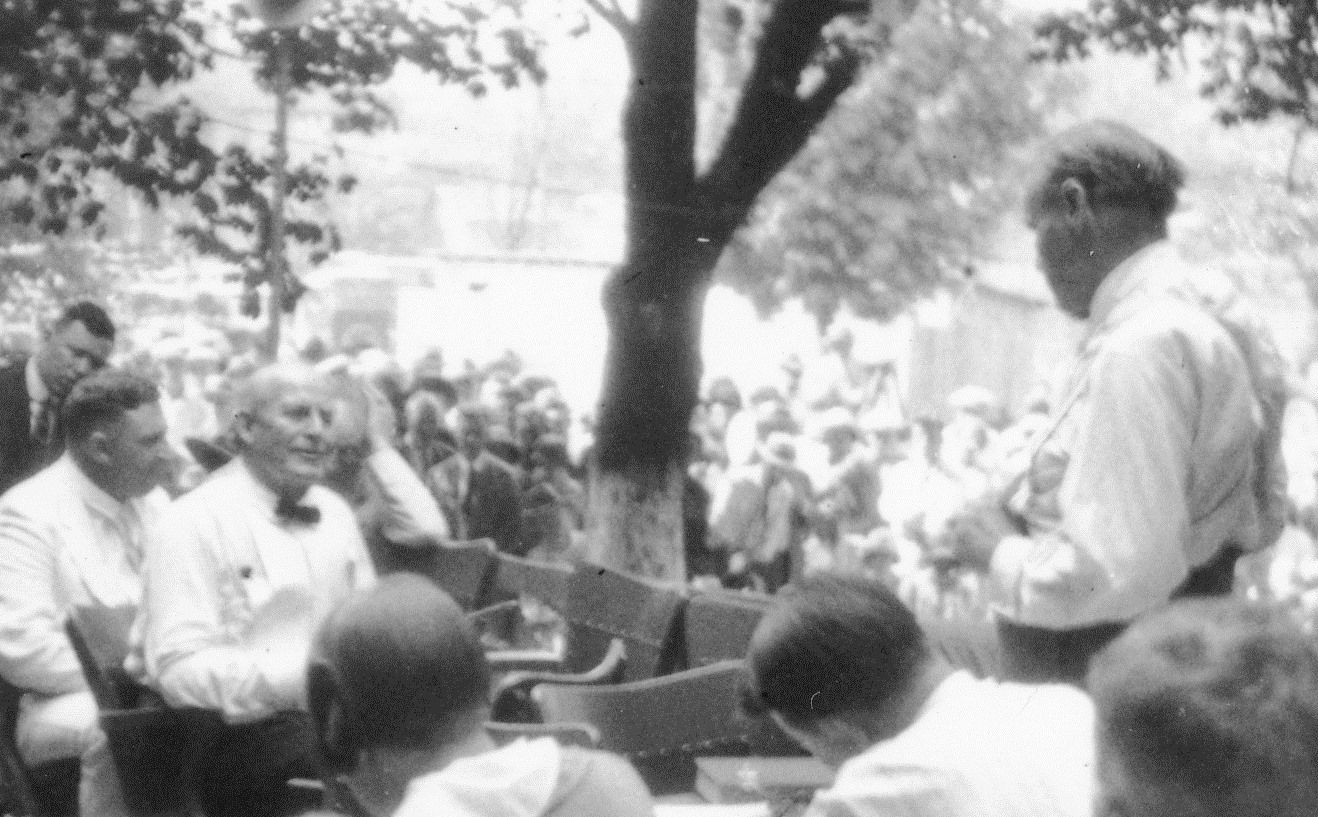
At the Scopes trial, William Jennings Bryan (seated, left) being questioned by Clarence Darrow (standing, right)

From July 10 to 21, 1925, Bryan participated in the highly publicized Scopes trial. The defendant, John T. Scopes, had violated the Butler Act, a Tennessee law barring the teaching of evolution in public schools, while serving as a substitute biology teacher in Dayton, Tennessee. His defense was funded by the American Civil Liberties Union and led in court by the famed lawyer Clarence Darrow. No one disputed that Scopes had violated the Butler Act, but Darrow argued that the statute violated the Establishment Clause of the First Amendment. Bryan defended the right of parents to choose what schools teach, argued that Darwinism was merely a "hypothesis", and claimed that Darrow and other intellectuals were trying to invalidate "every moral standard that the Bible gives us". The defense called Bryan as a witness and asked him about his belief in the literal word of the Bible, though the judge later expunged Bryan's testimony.

Ultimately, the judge instructed the jury to render a verdict of guilty, and Scopes was fined $100 (equal to $1,836 today) for violating the Butler Act. The national media reported the trial in great detail, with H. L. Mencken ridiculing Bryan as a symbol of Southern ignorance and anti-intellectualism. Even many Southern newspapers criticized Bryan's performance in the trial; the Memphis Commercial Appeal reported that "Darrow succeeded in showing that Bryan knows little about the science of the world". Bryan had been prevented from delivering a final argument at trial, but he arranged for the publication of the speech he had intended to give. In that publication, Bryan wrote that "science is a magnificent material force, but it is not a teacher of morals".

== Death ==
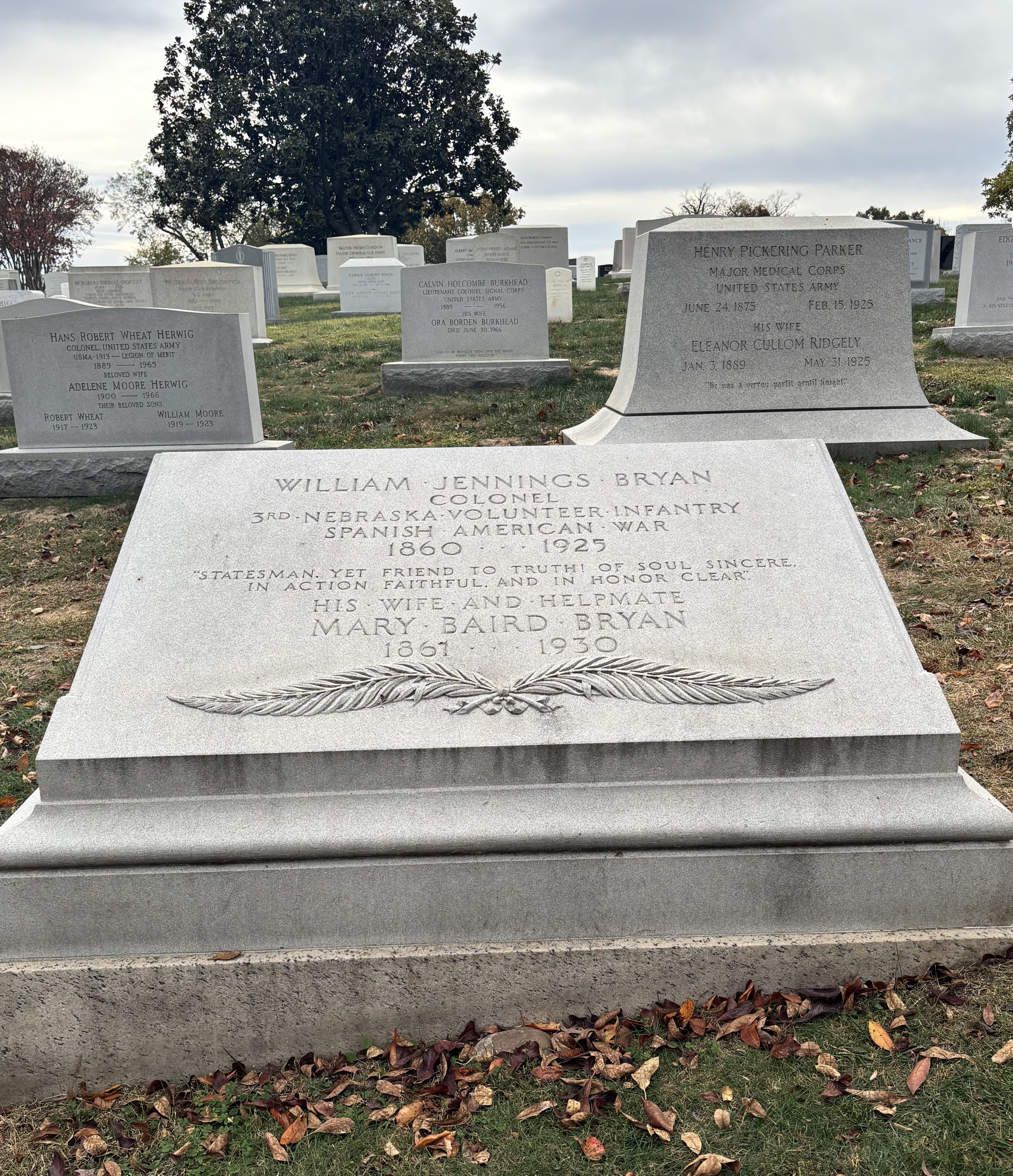
The Final Resting Place of William Jennings Bryan (1860-1925), Arlington National Cemetery, Arlington, VA

In the days after the Scopes Trial, Bryan delivered several speeches in Tennessee. On Sunday, July 26, 1925, Bryan died in his sleep from apoplexy after he had attended a church service in Dayton. Bryan's body was transported by rail from Dayton to Washington, D.C. He was buried at Arlington National Cemetery, with an epitaph that read, "Statesman, yet Friend to Truth! Of Soul Sincere, in Action Faithful, and in Honor Clear" and on the other side "He Kept the Faith".

== Family ==
Bryan remained married to his wife, Mary, until his death in 1925. Mary served as a very important adviser to her husband; she passed the bar exam and learned German to help his career. She was buried next to Bryan after her death in 1930. William and Mary had three children: Ruth (1886–1954), William Jr. (1889–1978), and Grace Dexter (1891–1945). Ruth won election to Congress from Florida in 1928 and later served as ambassador to Denmark during the presidency of Franklin D. Roosevelt. William Jr. graduated from Georgetown Law, established a legal practice in Los Angeles, later held several federal positions, and became an important figure in the Los Angeles Democratic Party. Grace also moved to Southern California and wrote a biography of her father. William Sr.'s brother, Charles, was an important supporter of his brother until William's death, as well as an influential politician in his own right. Charles served two terms as the mayor of Lincoln and three terms as the governor of Nebraska and was the Democratic vice presidential nominee in the 1924 presidential election.

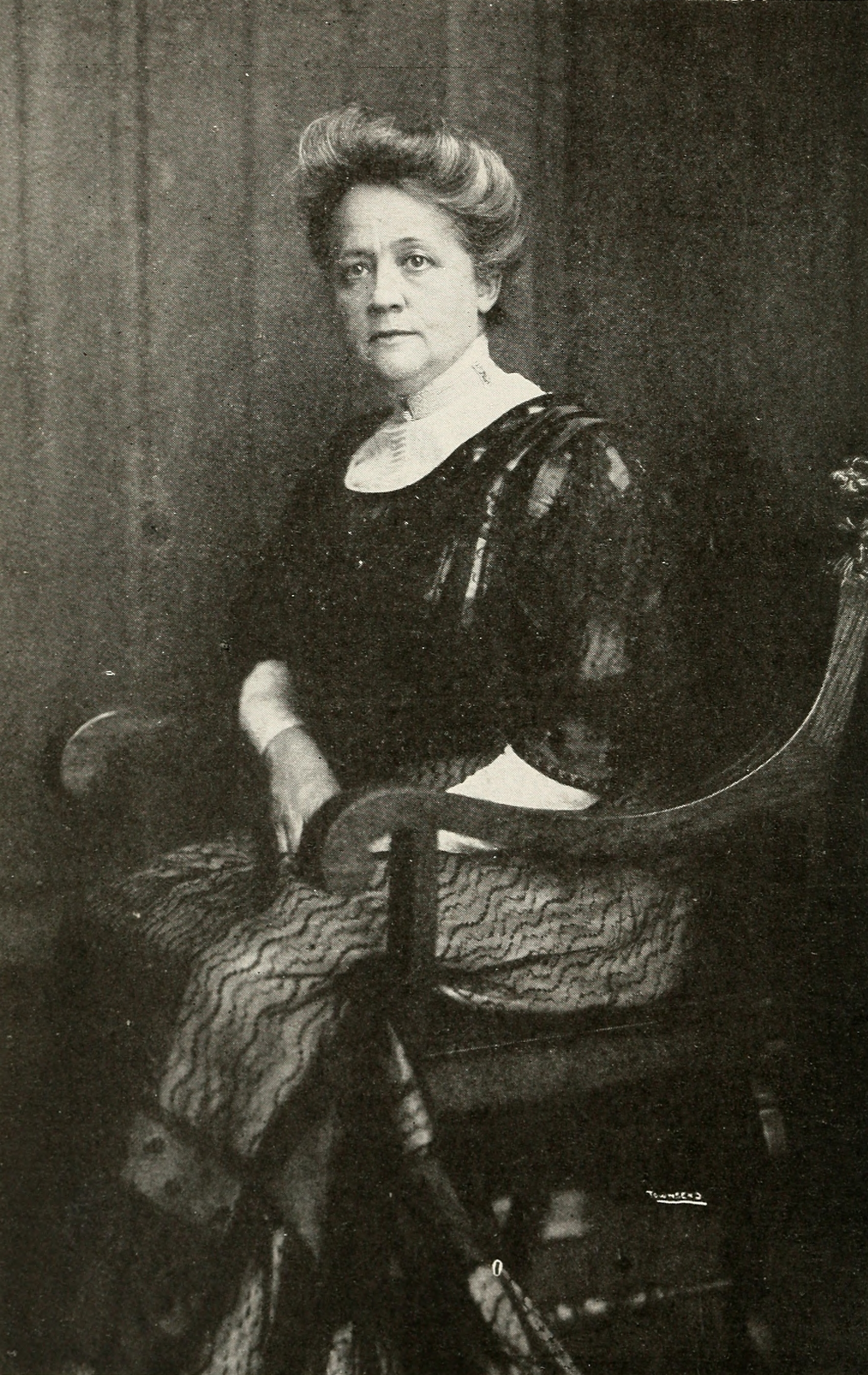
Bryan's wife, Mary Baird Bryan

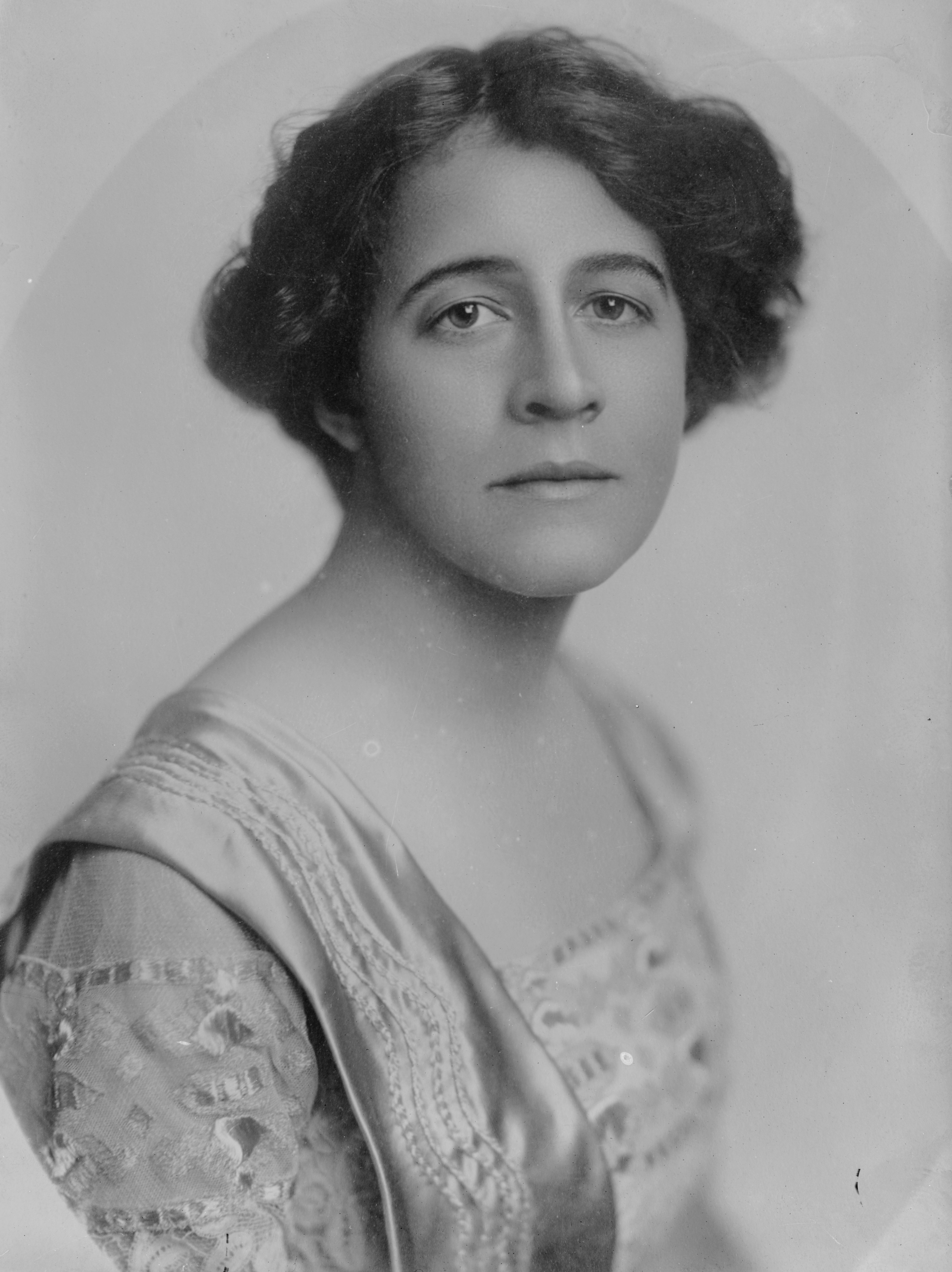
Ruth Bryan Owen

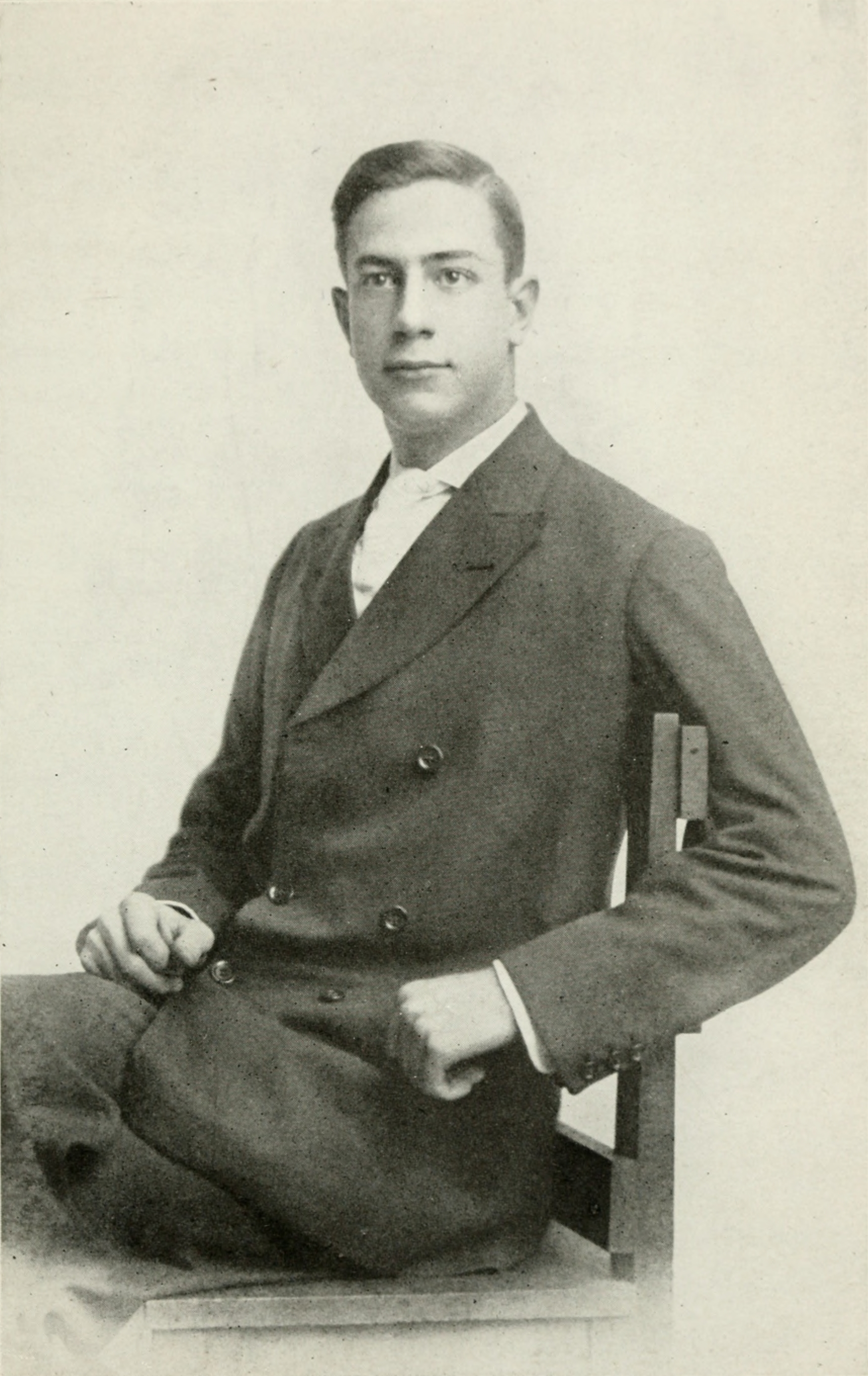
William Bryan Jr.

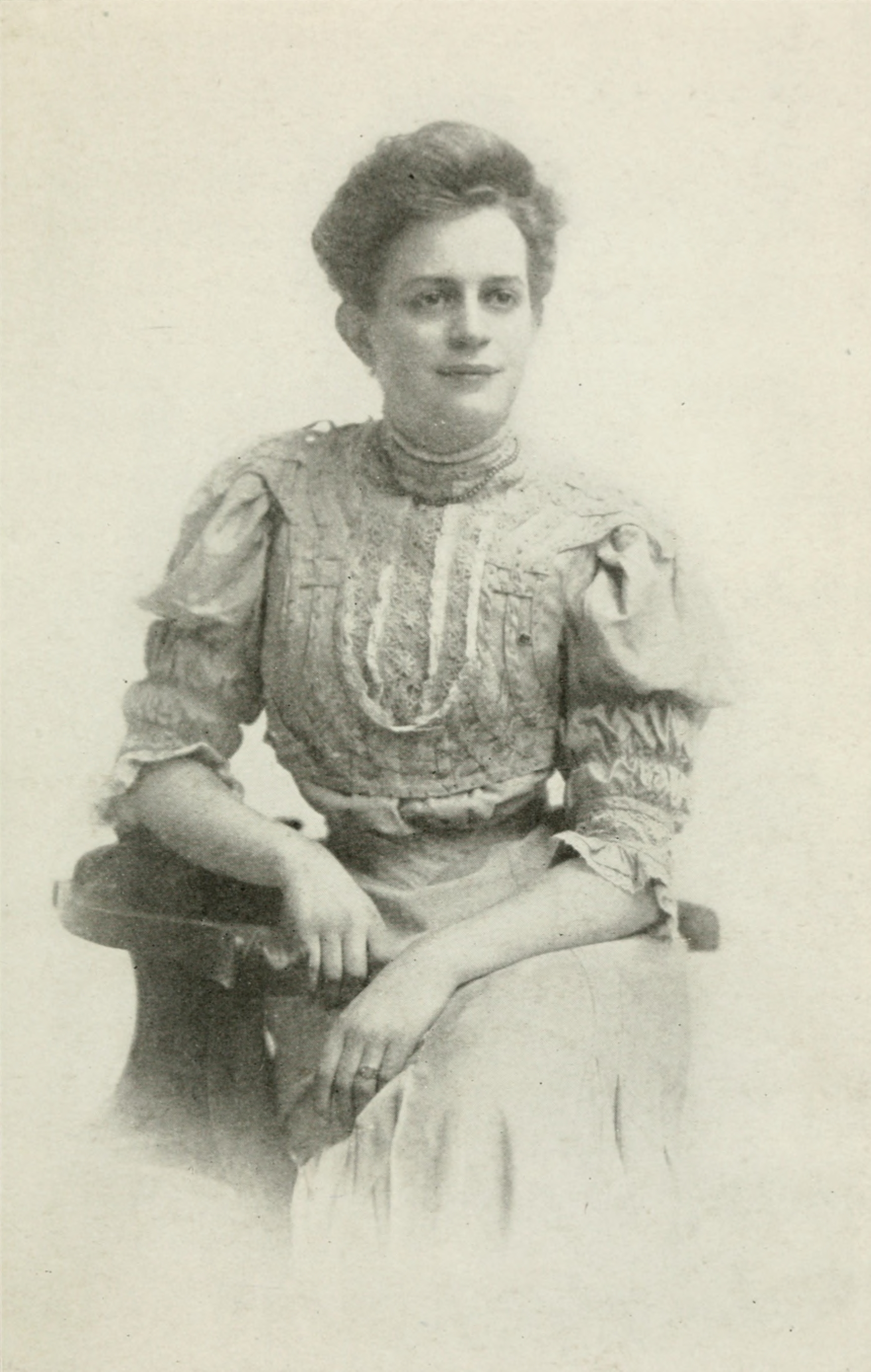
Grace Bryan

== Legacy ==
=== Historical reputation and political legacy ===
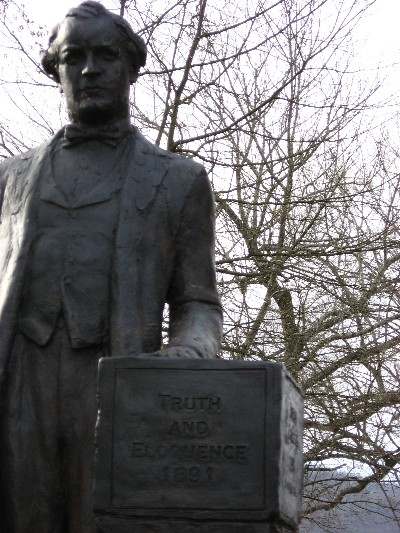
Statue of Bryan on the lawn of the Rhea County courthouse in Dayton, Tennessee

Bryan elicited mixed views during his lifetime and his legacy remains complicated. Author Scott Farris argues that "many fail to understand Bryan because he occupies a rare space in society ... too liberal for today's religious [and] too religious for today's liberals". Academic Jeff Taylor rejects the view that Bryan was a "pioneer of the welfare state" and a "forerunner of the New Deal", but argues that Bryan was more accepting of an interventionist federal government than his Democratic predecessors had been. In terms of his dominant role in the Democratic party between 1896 and 1912, historian David Sarasohn concluded the party became:

An issue-oriented party (tariff and child labor reform, trust regulation, federal income tax, direct election of senators) and an emerging national coalition (southerners, western Progressives, blue-collar ethnic voters, and liberal intellectuals), most of whom shared a grudging but genuine admiration for their titular leader, William Jennings Bryan. Indeed, it is the Commoner [Bryan] whose spirit, vision, and yes, political sagacity, pervades the narrative.

In long-term perspective, biographer Michael Kazin writes:

Bryan was the first leader of a major party to argue for permanently expanding the power of the federal government to serve the welfare of ordinary Americans from the working and middle classes ... he did more than any other man—between the fall of Grover Cleveland and the election of Woodrow Wilson—to transform his party from a bulwark of laissez-faire to the citadel of liberalism we identify with Franklin D. Roosevelt and his ideological descendants.

Kazin argues that, compared to Bryan, "only Theodore Roosevelt and Woodrow Wilson had a greater impact on politics and political culture during the era of reform that began in the mid-1890s and lasted until the early 1920s". Richard F. Pettigrew (R-SD) said of Bryan: "Bryan never knowingly served the vested interests. He fought them to the best of his ability." Writing in 1931, former Secretary of the Treasury William Gibbs McAdoo stated that "with the exception of the men who have occupied the White House, Bryan ... had more to do with the shaping of the public policies of the last 40 years than any other American citizen". Historian Robert D. Johnston notes that Bryan was "arguably [the] most influential politician from the Great Plains". In 2015, political scientist Michael G. Miller and historian Ken Owen ranked Bryan as one of the four most influential American politicians who never served as president, alongside Alexander Hamilton, Henry Clay, and John C. Calhoun.

Kazin emphasizes the limits of Bryan's influence by observing that "for decades after [Bryan]'s death, influential scholars and journalists depicted him as a self-righteous simpleton who longed to preserve an age that had already passed". Writing in 2006, editor Richard Lingeman commented that "William Jennings Bryan is mainly remembered as the fanatical old fool Fredric March played in Inherit the Wind". Similarly, in 2011, John McDermott wrote that "Bryan is perhaps best known as the sweaty crank of a lawyer who represented Tennessee in the Scopes trial. After his defence of creationism, he became a mocked caricature, a sweaty possessor of avoirdupois, bereft of bombast". Kazin writes that "scholars have increasingly warmed to Bryan's motives, if not his actions" in the Scopes Trial because of Bryan's rejection of eugenics, a practice that many evolutionists of the 1920s favored. Kazin also notes the stain that Bryan's acceptance of the Jim Crow laws places on his legacy, writing:

His one great flaw was to support, with a studied lack of reflection, the abusive system of Jim Crow—a view that was shared, until the late 1930s, by nearly every white Democrat… After Bryan's death in 1925, most intellectuals and activists on the broad left rejected the amalgam that had inspired him: a strict populist morality based on a close read reading of Scripture… Liberals and radicals from the age of FDR to the present have tended to scorn that credo as naïve and bigoted, a remnant of an era of white Protestant supremacy that has, or should have, passed.

Prominent individuals from both parties have praised Bryan and his legacy. In 1962, former President Harry Truman said Bryan "was a great one—one of the greatest". Truman also stated, "If it wasn't for old Bill Bryan, there wouldn't be any liberalism at all in the country now. Bryan kept liberalism alive, he kept it going." Tom L. Johnson, the progressive mayor of Cleveland, Ohio, referred to Bryan's campaign in 1896 as "the first great struggle of the masses in our country against the privileged classes". In a 1934 speech dedicating a memorial to Bryan, President Franklin D. Roosevelt said:

I think that we would choose the word 'sincerity' as fitting him [Bryan] most of all ... it was that sincerity that served him so well in his life-long fight against sham and privilege and wrong. It was that sincerity that made him a force for good in his own generation and kept alive many of the ancient faiths on which we are building today. We ... can well agree that he fought the good fight; that he finished the course; and that he kept the faith.

Into the 21st century, some conservative Republicans have hailed Bryan's legacy from a religious perspective. Ralph Reed described Bryan as "the most consequential evangelical politician of the 20th century". Bryan's career has also been compared to that of Donald Trump.

=== In popular culture ===
- In A Tale of Two Nations, an 1894 roman à clef of Silverite conspiracy theories surrounding the gold standard by Bryan's future friend and ally William Hope Harvey, a well-spoken and pro-silver Nebraska congressman defeats a British Jew's attempts to defend the gold standard and marries their mutual love interest.
- It has been argued by economists, historians, and literary critics that L. Frank Baum satirized Bryan as the Cowardly Lion in The Wonderful Wizard of Oz, which was published in 1900. Those assertions are based partly on Baum's history as a Republican supporter who advocated in his role as a journalist on behalf of William McKinley and his policies.
- Vachel Lindsay's 1919 "singing poem" "Bryan, Bryan, Bryan, Bryan" is a lengthy tribute to the idol of the poet's youth.
- Bryan played a minor role in Thomas Wolfe's Look Homeward Angel (1929).
- Bryan also has a biographical part in "The 42nd Parallel" (1930) in John Dos Passos' USA Trilogy.
- Edwin Maxwell played Bryan in the 1944 film Wilson.
- Inherit the Wind, a 1955 play by Jerome Lawrence and Robert Edwin Lee, is a highly fictionalized account of the Scopes Trial written in response to McCarthyism. A populist thrice-defeated presidential candidate from Nebraska named Matthew Harrison Brady (based on Bryan) comes to a small town to help prosecute a young teacher for teaching evolution to his schoolchildren. He is opposed by a famous trial lawyer, Henry Drummond (based on Darrow) and mocked by a cynical newspaperman (based on Mencken) as the trial assumes a national profile. The 1960 film adaptation was directed by Stanley Kramer and starred Fredric March as Brady and Spencer Tracy as Drummond.
- Bryan appears as a character in Douglas Moore's 1956 opera The Ballad of Baby Doe.
- Ainslie Pryor played Bryan in a 1956 episode of the CBS anthology series You Are There.
- Bryan also appears in the humorous science fiction novel And Having Writ... (1978) by Donald R. Bensen.
- Bryan appears in Gore Vidal's 1987 novel Empire.
- The 1992 short story "Plowshare" by Martha Soukup and part of the 1984 novel Job: A Comedy of Justice by Robert A. Heinlein are set in worlds where Bryan became president.
- A portrayal of Bryan is featured in the History Channel's 2012 miniseries docudrama The Men Who Built America.
- Bryan is mentioned in the folk song "Blue Water Line" as stoking coal on a restored train.

=== Memorials ===
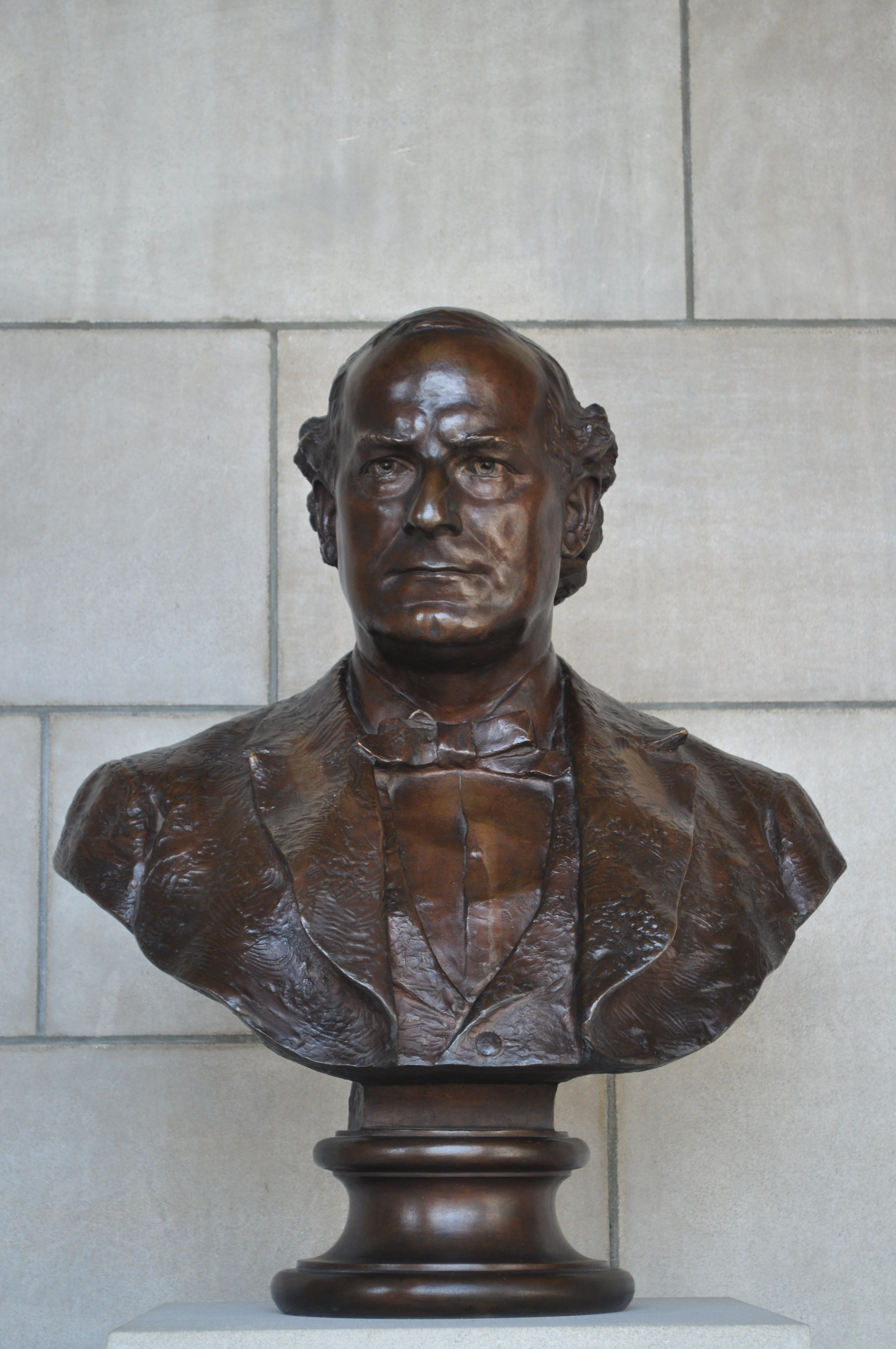
A bust of Bryan, created by William Whitney Manatt in 1905 for the Nebraska Hall of Fame

The William Jennings Bryan House, in Nebraska, was named a U.S. National Historic Landmark in 1963. The Bryan Home Museum is an appointment-only museum at his birthplace in Salem, Illinois. Salem is also home to Bryan Park and a large statue of Bryan. His home at Asheville, North Carolina, from 1917 to 1920, the William Jennings Bryan House, was listed on the National Register of Historic Places in 1983. Villa Serena, Bryan's property in Miami, Florida, is also listed on the National Register of Historic Places.

President Franklin D. Roosevelt delivered an address on May 3, 1934, dedicating a statue of William Jennings Bryan created by Gutzon Borglum, the sculptor of Mount Rushmore. This Bryan statue by Borglum originally stood in Washington, D.C., but was displaced by highway construction and moved by an Act of Congress in 1961 to Salem, Illinois, Bryan's birthplace.

A statue of Bryan represented the state of Nebraska in the National Statuary Hall in the United States Capitol, as part of the National Statuary Hall Collection. In 2019, a statue of Chief Standing Bear replaced the statue of Bryan in the National Statuary Hall.

Bryan was named to the Nebraska Hall of Fame in 1971, and a bust of him resides there, in the Nebraska State Capitol. Bryan was honored by the United States Postal Service with a $2 Great Americans series postage stamp.

Numerous objects, places and people have been named after Bryan, including Bryan County, Oklahoma, Bryan Medical Center in Lincoln, Nebraska, and Bryan College, located in Dayton, Tennessee. Omaha Bryan High School and Bryan Middle School in Bellevue, Nebraska, are also named for Bryan. During World War II the Liberty ship SS William J. Bryan was built in Panama City, Florida, and WJ A Bryan Elementary School in Miami, named in his honor.

== See also ==
- The Rhetorical Presidency
- T. T. Martin

== Citations ==
=== Bibliography ===
- Clements, Kendrick A. (1982). William Jennings Bryan, Missionary Isolationist. University of Tennessee Press. ISBN 978-0-87049-364-5.
- Coletta, Paolo E. William Jennings Bryan. Vol. 1. Archived from the original (3 vols.) on March 16, 2012 – via Questia. Online vol. 2; online vol. 3.
  - ——— (1964). William Jennings Bryan, Vol. 1: Political Evangelist, 1860–1908. University of Nebraska Press. ISBN 978-0-8032-0022-7.
  - ——— (1969). William Jennings Bryan, Vol. 2: Progressive Politician and Moral Statesman. University of Nebraska Press. ISBN 978-0-8032-0023-4.
  - ——— (1969). William Jennings Bryan, Vol. 3: Political Puritan, 1915–1925. University of Nebraska Press. ISBN 978-0-8032-0024-1.
- ——— (1984). "Will the Real Progressive Stand Up? William Jennings Bryan and Theodore Roosevelt to 1909". Nebraska History. 65: 15–57.
- Farris, Scott (2013). Almost President: The Men Who Lost the Race but Changed the Nation. Rowman & Littlefield. ISBN 978-0-7627-8421-9.
- Hibben, Paxton (1929). The Peerless leader, William Jennings Bryan. Farrar & Rinehart, Inc.
- Kazin, Michael (2006). A Godly Hero: The Life of William Jennings Bryan. Knopf. ISBN 978-0-375-41135-9.
- Levine, Lawrence W. (1965). Defender of The Faith: William Jennings Bryan: The Last Decade 1915–1925. Oxford University Press.
- Rove, Karl (2016). The Triumph of William McKinley: Why the Election of 1896 Still Matters. Simon and Schuster. ISBN 978-1-4767-5296-9.
- Thompson, Charles Willis (June 13, 1925). "Silver-Tongue". Profiles. The New Yorker. Vol. 1, no. 17. pp. 9–10.
- Sicius, Francis J. (2015). The Progressive Era: A Reference Guide. ABC-CLIO. ISBN 978-1-61069-447-6.
- Taylor, Jeff (2006). Where Did the Party Go?: William Jennings Bryan, Hubert Humphrey, and the Jeffersonian Legacy. Columbia: University of Missouri Press. ISBN 978-0-8262-1659-5.

U.S. House of Representatives
Preceded by William James Connell	Member of the U.S. House of Representatives from Nebraska's 1st congressional district 1891–1895	Succeeded by Jesse Burr Strode
Party political offices
Preceded by Grover Cleveland	Democratic nominee for President of the United States; 1896, 1900	Succeeded by Alton B. Parker
Preceded by James B. Weaver	Populist nominee for President of the United States; Endorsed; 1896	Succeeded by Wharton Barker
Preceded by Alton B. Parker	Democratic nominee for President of the United States; 1908	Succeeded by Woodrow Wilson
Political offices
Preceded by Philander C. Knox	United States Secretary of State; 1913–1915	Succeeded by Robert Lansing
