= William Jennings Bryan Jr. =

American lawyer and politician

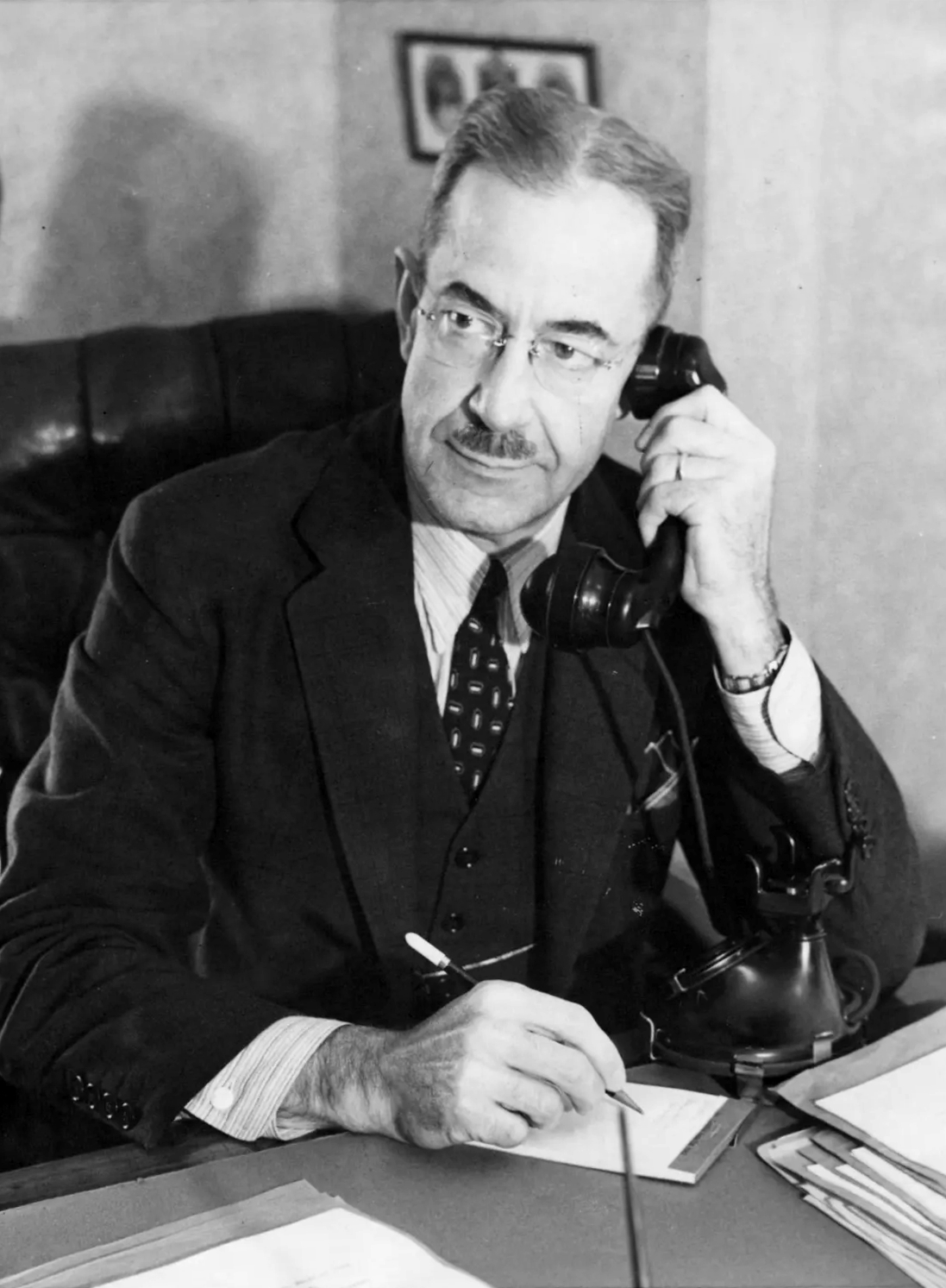
- Bryan in 1938

Collector of the Port of Los Angeles
- In office March 16, 1938 – June 22, 1953
- Appointed by: Franklin D. Roosevelt; Harry S. Truman
- Preceded by: Alfred A. Cohn
- Succeeded by: Carl F. White

Assistant United States Attorney for the District of Arizona
- In office 1915–1919
- Appointed by: Thomas Watt Gregory
- U.S. Attorney: Thomas A. Flynn
- Preceded by: Wiley E. Jones

Personal details
- Born: June 24, 1889 Lincoln, Nebraska, U.S.
- Died: March 27, 1978 (aged 88) Santa Fe, New Mexico, U.S.
- Party: Democratic
- Spouse(s): Helen Berger (m. 1909; div. 1927) Ella Bent (m. 1929; died 1973)
- Children: 3
- Parent(s): William Jennings Bryan; Mary Baird Bryan
- Relatives: Ruth Bryan Owen (sister)
- Education: University of Nebraska; University of Arizona (A.B.); Georgetown School of Law
- Occupation: Lawyer, politician

William Jennings Bryan Jr. (June 24, 1889 – March 27, 1978) was an American lawyer and politician who served as collector of the Port of Los Angeles from 1938 to 1953. He was the only son of Democratic presidential candidate William Jennings Bryan.

== Biography ==
William Jennings Bryan Jr. was born on June 24, 1889 in Lincoln, Nebraska, the son of attorneys William Jennings Bryan and Mary Baird Bryan. Following in their footsteps, he graduated from the University of Arizona in 1912 with an A.B., studied further at the University of Nebraska and the Georgetown School of Law, and became a practicing attorney in Tucson in 1914.

Bryan was appointed a member of the Arizona Board of Regents by governor George W. P. Hunt in 1914, and the next year was appointed an assistant United States attorney for the district of Arizona by attorney general Thomas Watt Gregory. He resigned both positions in 1919 and moved to Southern California the following year.

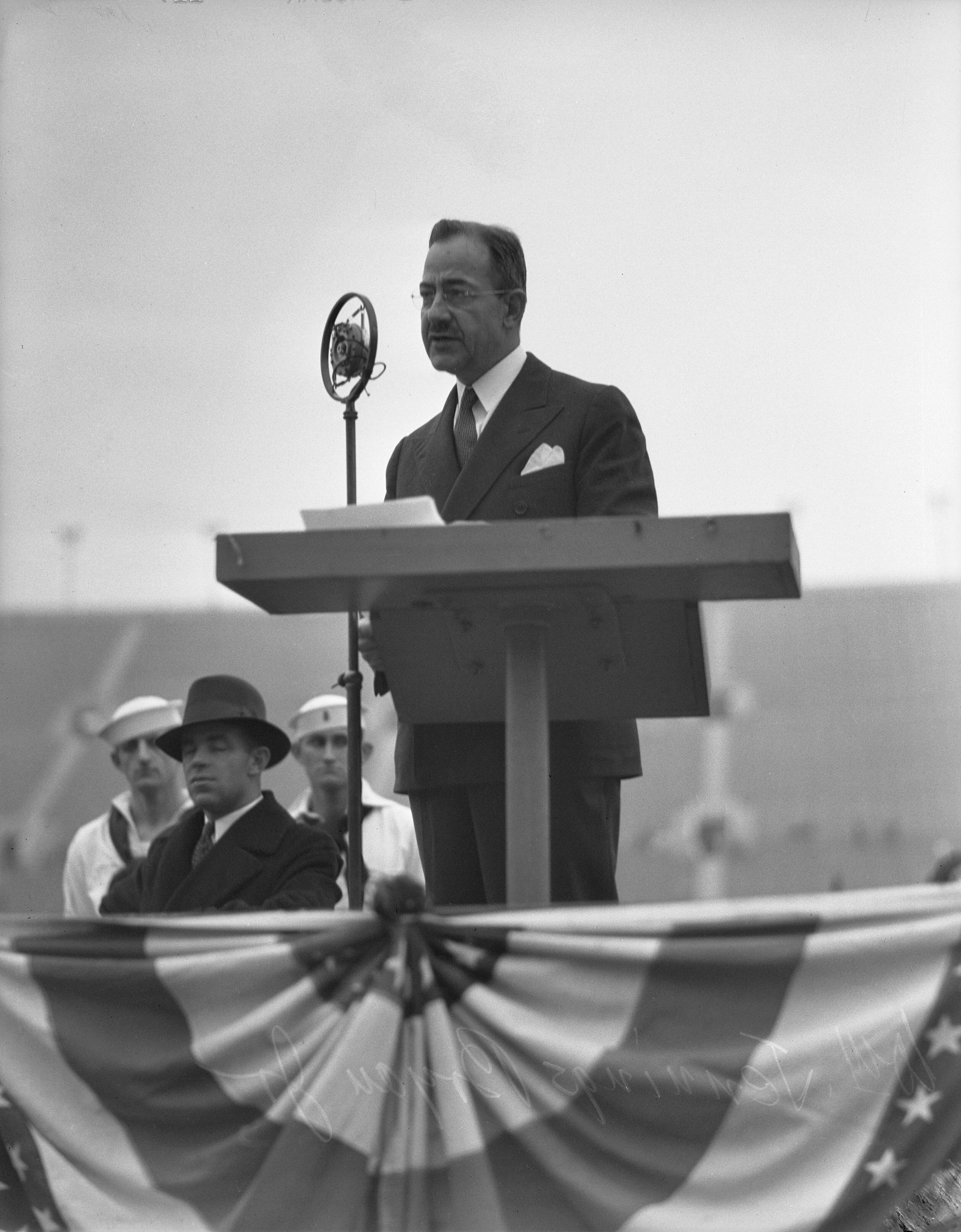
Bryan speaking at an Armistice Day observance at the Los Angeles Memorial Coliseum, 1934

Bryan was an unsuccessful candidate for lieutenant governor of California in 1934, losing the Democratic primary to EPIC candidate Sheridan Downey. In the same election, socialist muckraker Upton Sinclair won the Democratic nomination for governor. Refusing to endorse Sinclair and denouncing him as a "socialist interloper," Bryan joined "Democrats for Merriam" and refuted claims that his father would have endorsed EPIC. After Sinclair lost the election, Bryan celebrated that "[the] most menacing peril to the New Deal has been removed." In his I, Candidate for Governor: And How I Got Licked, Sinclair claimed Bryan had opposed him to protect his inheritance and receive a judgeship from Merriam.

In 1938, Bryan was appointed collector of the Port of Los Angeles by president Franklin D. Roosevelt, on the recommendation of Senator William Gibbs McAdoo. In a profile by Lemuel F. Parton published shortly after, Bryan was contrasted with his famously-unkempt father as "fussy about his dress, severely and fastidiously groomed with a jaunty little mustache and a nice collection of malacca sticks, sports clothes and varied haberdashery." While he shared his father's convictions for anti-evolutionism and free silver, Bryan was described as speaking with "calm, legalistic precision" as opposed to his father's fiery oratory. He was reappointed by president Harry S. Truman and served until his retirement in 1953.

Bryan moved from California to Santa Fe, New Mexico in 1975. He died there on March 27, 1978. He was survived by his three daughters, a stepson, and several grandchildren and great-grandchildren.
