= Villa Serena =

- William Jennings Bryan House
- U.S. National Register of Historic Places
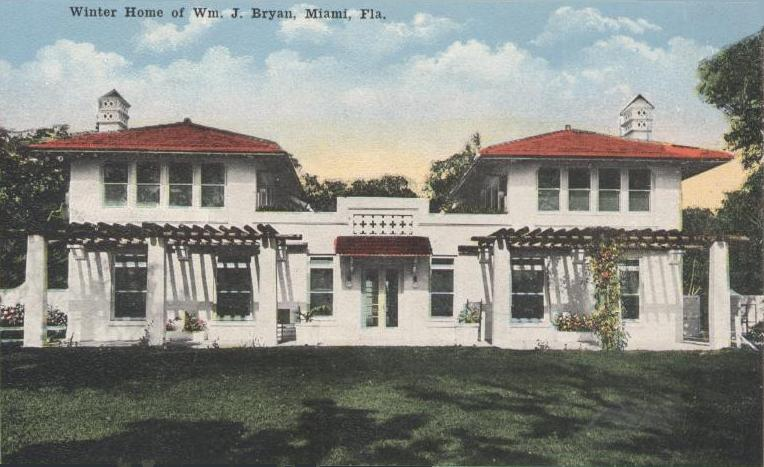

- Location within Florida
- Location: Miami, Florida
- Coordinates: 25°44′49.9″N 80°12′29.9″W
- Built: 1913
- Architect: August Geiger
- Architectural style: Mediterranean Revival
- NRHP reference No.: 11001029
- Added to NRHP: January 20, 2012

Villa Serena, also known as the William Jennings Bryan House, in Miami, Florida, was a winter home of politician William Jennings Bryan. The Bryans hosted events of 500 persons there many times.

It was designed by architect August Geiger (1887-1968).

Villa Serena was purchased by philanthropist Adrienne Arsht in 2007. Arsht spent four years renovating the property, keeping it in line with the traditional architectural elements.

It was listed on the National Register of Historic Places in January, 2012.
