= Spitzeln =

German card game

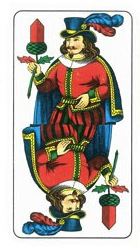
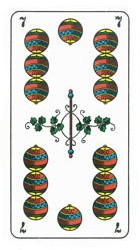
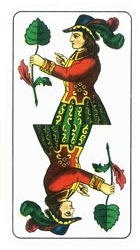
- The top cards when Bells are trumps: O, 7, O. The top trumps when Bells are the trump suit
- Origin: Germany
- Alternative names: Solo zu Dreien
- Type: Point-trick
- Players: 3
- Cards: 24 cards
- Deck: German pack
- Rank (high→low): T: O 7 O D K (O) U 10–8; Plain: D K (O) U 10 9 (8) 7
- Play: Clockwise

Related games
- Quadrille, Ombre, German Solo

Spitzeln is an historical German card game for three players and a variant of German Solo.

== History ==
Spitzeln is recorded as early as 1840 in Neustes Spielbuch by Grimm, who describes two variants, and it continues to appear in German game anthologies until the 1890s. By 1909 it was being described as out of fashion.

Von Alvensleben notes that it is a three-handed variant of Solo that is also called German l'Hombre after "the most successful card game ever invented". However, this was an improper designation since it "has little more in common [with l'Hombre] than the fact that there are three people playing." He goes on to say that, while the game is not without interest, it does not have the diversity of four-handed Solo because a solo is the only contract that may be played. However, it is more expensive because stakes are placed more often, because if no-one opts to play a solo, the cards are thrown in and redealt. Thus the pot grows very rapidly. Spitzeln was also called Tritrille or called Solo Solitaire.

== Rules ==
The following rules are based on Grimm.

=== First variant ===
==== Cards ====
Spitzeln is played with a pack of German-suited cards from which the 8 of Hearts and all the bells have been removed apart from the Seven of Bells, leaving 24 cards. The cards rank in their natural order: Deuce > King > Ober > Unter > Ten > Nine > Eight > Seven.

The Ober of Acorns is the permanent top trump and is known as the Old Man (it corresponds to the Spadille in Ombre). The second-highest card is the trump Seven or Spitze. The Ober of Leaves is the third-highest (and corresponds to the Basta in Ombre). These three cards are matadors, as are any other cards of the trump suit that follow them consecutively. All matadors attract special bonuses. The suit of Bells ranks above the other suits and is called the couleur. If trumps are not Bells, the Seven of Bells counts as a Deuce. Nevertheless, because there are no other cards in this suit, you have to ensure there are no trumps left before playing it otherwise it will be trumped.

==== Playing ====
Player order and dealer are randomly determined. The dealer shuffles, offers the cut to rearhand and then deals eight cards, clockwise, to each player. Only Solo games are possible and, to win, the soloist has to take five tricks. Starting with the dealer's left, players announce whether they will play or pass.

If the dealer plays, he antes four chips (Marken) to the pot (Pot) as a basic stake (Stamm); if not, he pays nothing, but after passing the next dealer must ante four chips.

If all three players pass, the cards are thrown in and the next dealer takes over.

==== Scoring ====
Scoring is as follows:

Scoring in Spitzeln
Contract or Bonus	Solo (, or are trumps)	Solo Couleur ( Bells are trumps)
3 Matadors	3	6
Each additional Matador	1	1
Solo	4	8
Solo and 3 Matadors	-	14
Tout	8	16
Solo Tout	12	24
Solo Tout and 3 Matadors	-	30
First 5 tricks (no matadors)	-	12
First 5 tricks (with matadors)	-	12

If there are more than 12 chips in the pot, only 12 chips are won or lost, but a player who is bête and on deal must pay 16 chips.

=== Second variant - Spitzeln with Fifteens ===
This variant differs from the first in that the cards are not thrown in if no-one bids to play Solo.

If all three players pass, the forehand leads to the first trick and each player tries to win as many tricks and card points as possible. The Deuces score 5 points, the Kings 4, the Obers 3, the Unters 2, and the Tens 1, giving a total of 45 points. Players pay chips to the other players who outscore them, 1 chip per point difference.

In this game nothing is drawn from the plate (Teller) and there are no matadors; the Old One and the Basta rank within their suits as normal Obers.

== Four-hand game ==
Both variants may also be played by four players. For that, the dealer always passes and sits out. Otherwise the rules are the same as for three players.

== Literature ==
- Grimm, Georg (1840). Neuestes Spielbuch. Otto Wigand, Leipzig.
- Meyer, Hermann Julius (1897). Meyers Konversations-Lexicon: ein Nachschlagewerk des allgemeinen Wissens, Vol. 16. Bibliographisches Institut.
- Meyer, Hermann Julius (1909). Meyers Großes Konversations-Lexicon. Vol. 18, Leipzig.
- Von Alvensleben, L. (1853). Encyklopädie der Spiele, Otto Wigand, Leipzig, pp. 527-530.
