= Virapulla =

Swedish gaming container

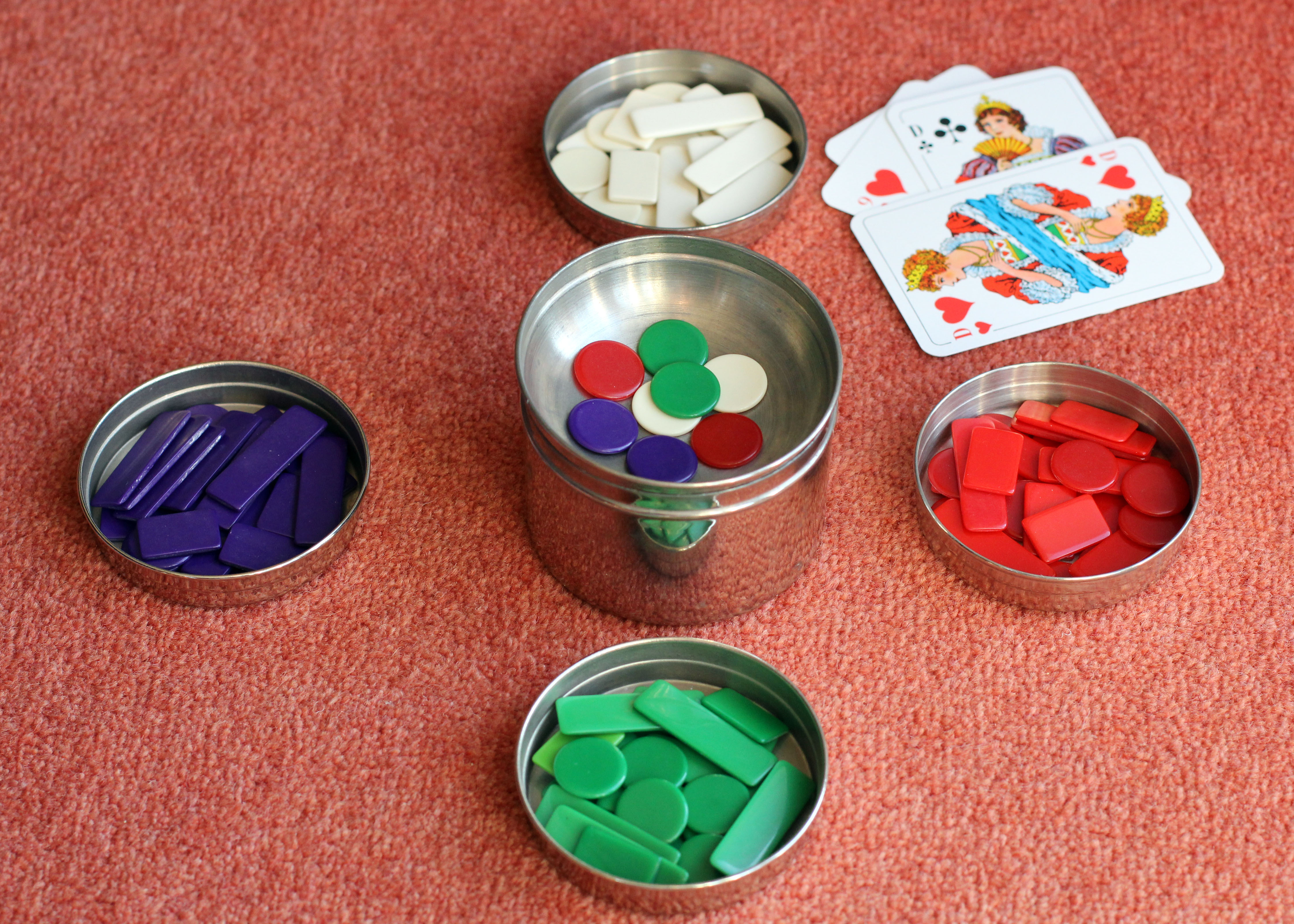
A virapulla set

Virapulla is a traditional Swedish container designed to hold poker chips or tokens used in the card game Vira. Typically round and lidded, the virapulla often features separate compartments for each player and a reversible lid that can serve as a central pot. The name combines Vira, the name of the game, with pulla, a Swedish word derived from the French poulan, meaning a gaming bowl. While originally associated with porcelain or metal constructions, modern versions can be made from plastic or other materials. Though once a common household item in Sweden, virapullas today are primarily of interest to collectors and enthusiasts of traditional card games.

== Design and Use ==
The virapulla is typically a circular container with a fitted lid and multiple internal compartments. It is specifically designed to hold the gaming tokens used in the Swedish trick-taking card game Vira, which was particularly popular in the 19th and early 20th centuries. Each compartment within the virapulla is usually designated for a specific player, allowing for easy organization of chips during gameplay.

The lid of the virapulla often serves a dual function. When flipped over, it can be used as a communal pot where players place wagers or stakes during certain phases of the game. This practical feature reflects the thoughtful integration of form and function in traditional Swedish game equipment.

Virapullas have been made from a variety of materials, including porcelain, wood, metal, and plastic. Porcelain versions, especially those from the 19th century, were often ornately decorated and are now considered collectible items. Later models, particularly those made in the mid-20th century, tended to be simpler and mass-produced.

== Description ==
A virapulla container may be made of plastic, china or metal. The counters are based on the old French system with circular, short and long rectangular pieces known in French as jetons, fiches and contrats. There are individual dishes for the players and the container has a reversible lid for the common pool. The name is derived from the game of Vira and the French word poulan, which means "gaming dish". The French influence may be because Vira was derived from the then French games of Ombre and Boston. The game was invented in the 19th century and the virapulla in the early 20th century.
