= Kodilj =

Kodilj, from the Spanish' codille is a double bet in Vira and other Swedish card games. The word is often abbreviated to ko ("become a cow"), with the extension kossa. If you lose more than two games under kodilj, these are called "calves" (kalven: "become a calf"); however they are never paid at a rate that is more than kodilj.
