= Vira (card game) =

Swedish three-player card game

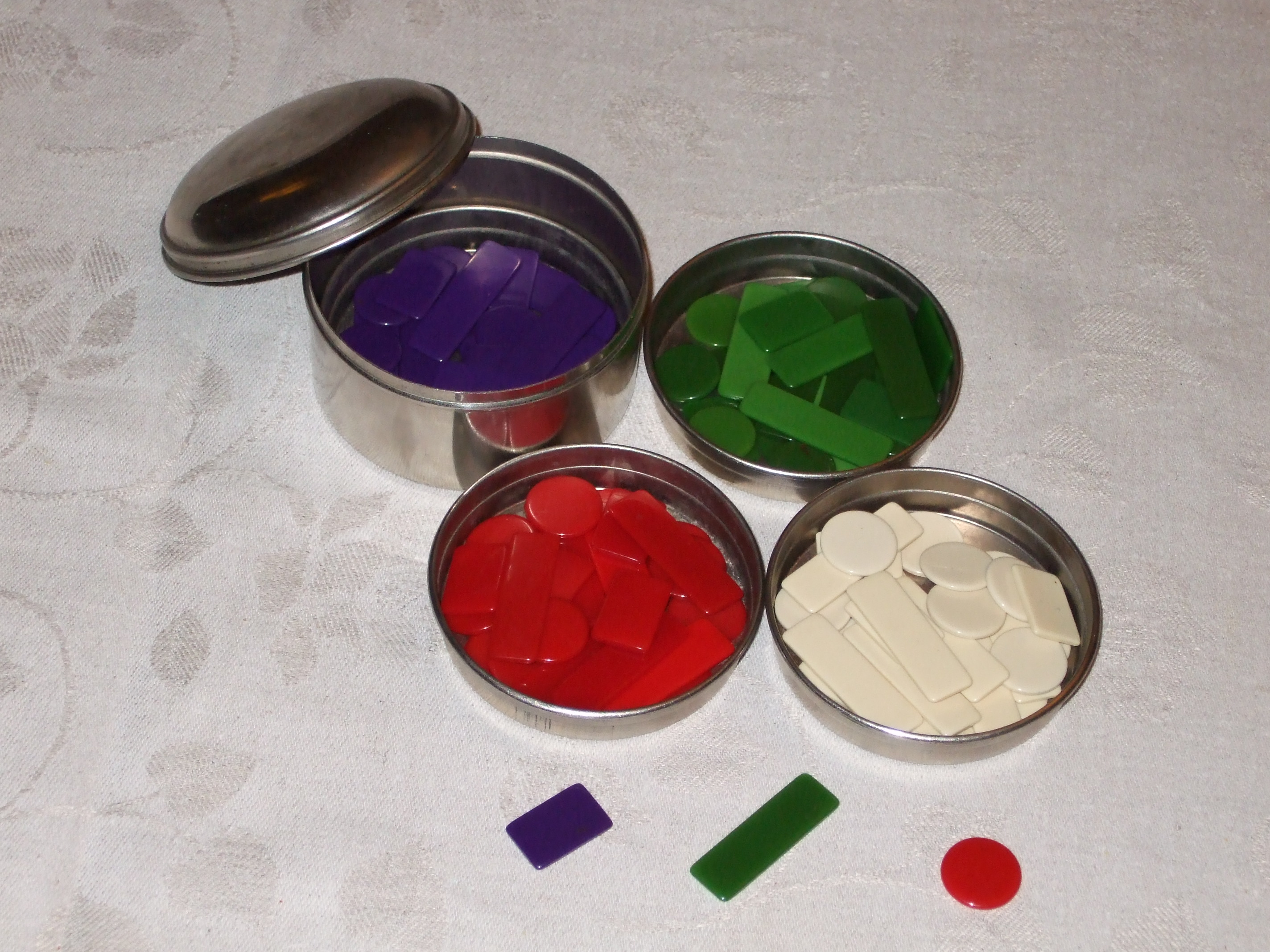
A so-called virapulla: a container for chips used in the card game, Vira.

Vira, or Wira, is a traditional Swedish card game for three players that game designer Dan Glimne has called "Sweden's national card game". It is the most elaborate game of the Solo family that includes Solo Whist and Préférence and is "one of the most complex games ever designed".

== History ==
Playing Vira was a popular social pastime during the 19th century and there are still Vira parties in Sweden. It is unclear when the game arose. According to tradition, the game was invented in Vira courthouse around 1810. It is said that a terrible storm caused the court to become snowbound inside and they could not leave the mill. So they played all the card games they knew and eventually invented a new one, which was named after the place. Two gentlemen of Walloon extraction are supposed be the inventors of the game. But since Vira is a game for three, a third party was probably involved.

== Description ==
Vira is a trick-taking game. The actual trick play is preceded by an auction, as in Bridge. The player who bids the highest contract plays against the other two players. Vira is a very complicated card game and there are several variants of the rules. It is played with gaming chips of which there are three or four different types. The stakes are placed in a so-called virapulla (pictured). The dealer deals 13 cards each. Then an auction takes place in which there are 40 contracts to choose from. The one who announces the highest contract becomes the declarer; the other two become the defenders. After the auction, the declarer may 'buy' cards from the talon in a procedure called the 'purchase' (köpet). Then the trick-taking game begins. When play is finished, the 'payment' (betalningen) follows. Here, the declarer either gets paid in chips or has to pay chips to the opponents depending on what bid the declarer made and how the game went. Then the next round begins.

For a long time it was the most advanced and popular card game in Sweden. Perhaps because it never became standardized as, for example, Skat did in Germany, its popularity fell fast after the arrival of Contract Bridge in the early 1930s.

== See also ==
- Kodilj
- Kille

== Literature ==
- Helmfrid, Sten (2003). Konsten att spela vira (in Swedish). Kista : S. Helmfrid: www.books-on-demand.com, distributör. ISBN 91-631-4430-1. SELIBR 9556547
- Glimne, Dan (1996). Kortspelshandboken: allt om kortspel och spelkort (in Swedish). Stockholm: B. Wahlström. ISBN 91-32-32121-X. SELIBR 7243316
- Nilsson, Göran B. (1973). Handbok i vira (in Swedish). Stockholm: Askild & Kärnekull. ISBN 91-7008-247-2. SELIBR 7589386
- Werner, Einar; Tore, Sandgren (1978) [1975]. Kortoxen. När-Var-Hur-serien, 99-0106773-1 (in Swedish) (9th revised and expanded, 2nd tr. ed.). Stockholm: Forum. ISBN 91-37-05798-7. SELIBR 7254060
