= Casino chip collecting =

Casino chip collecting is the practice of intentionally taking casino chips (also called "cheques") from casino premises or trading or collecting online, or in person, for the purpose of collection. Casino chip collecting is a variety of exonumia, or coin collecting. Before it became a more serious hobby, casino chip collecting was simply a case of people keeping them as souvenirs from a casino they may visit. The biggest boost to the hobby came with the creation of the online auction site eBay. eBay has now become the most popular way to collect and trade casino chips with listings in the casino category regularly including more than 20,000 items for sale.

== History ==
Casino chip collecting became increasingly popular during the 1980s, as evidenced by the sale of chips through several casino and collecting newsletters. Bill Borland's Worldwide Casino Exchange (early 1980s) had a casino story each issue and dozens of old chips for sale. Likewise, Al W. Moe's Casino and Gaming Chips magazine ran for several years in the mid-1980s and attracted hundreds of subscribers. Each issue featured stories and pictures from old Nevada casinos and included photos of old, collectible chips.

Archie Black established the Casino Chip & Gaming Tokens Collectors Club (CC&GTCC) in 1988 in response to the continuing evolution and popularity of chip collecting. Membership in the club includes an annual subscription to the club's magazine, Casino Collectible News, now in its 26th year. The magazine has won six First Place Awards from the American Numismatic Association for Outstanding Specialty Numismatic Publication.

The club held its first annual convention at the Aladdin Hotel and Casino in 1992. The 34th annual convention will be held at South Point Hotel, Casino & Spa, June 17-19, 2027.

As the number of collectors grew, the creation of an official grading system was viewed as being a useful tool in part of the process to help determine the collectible value of the chips, as opposed to the face value they can also represent. In 2003, members of the CC&GTCC's Standards and Archives Committee agreed on a grading system that would be used worldwide. It is worth noting that, for the most part, the chips meet the minimum value set by the casino. There are many published price guides, but two in particular are more widely used by casino chip collectors. The Official U.S. Casino Chip Price Guide, now in its 4th edition, covers chips from casinos in Nevada, Atlantic City, New Jersey, Colorado, Deadwood, South Dakota and the several Midwest States that permit Riverboat casinos. The Chip Rack, now in its 21st edition, attempts to include all chips and checks issued by casinos in the State of Nevada. Some chips are considered high-value and have a listed value as high as $50,000. During their 2014 convention, a $5 chip from the Golden Goose sold for $75,000, and a $5 chip from the Lucky Casino sold for $52,500.

In 2017, the Board of Directors established the Casino Collectibles Association (CCA) as a d/b/a or "Doing Business As," for the CC&GTCC, Inc., reflecting their change from exonumia (chips, tokens) to gaming memorabilia.

== Classification of chips ==
Below is the system that is currently used to grade them:

Grade	Description
New (N)	Never used in games; square and round edge chips will be as from the manufacturer with absolutely no wear, no dings or nicks; no scratches on surface of chip or inlay.
Slightly Used (SU)	Only slight signs of use, edge still crisp but ever so slightly dulled with very little wear; cross hatching may show slight wear near edge; few or no edge nicks; still retains luster in mold design; bold hot stamp; inlays excellent.
Average (A)	Typical chip found in play after months/years of use; slightly rounded edges; will have minor defects such as small nicks on edges; inlays are beginning to show even wear and about half of the cross hatching has worn from the body surface; hot-stamps have dulled, beginning to show even wear and may be missing a small amount of foil.
Well Used (WU)	Moderate and uniform wear of edge, surface and hot stamp; noticeable edge nicks and/or surface scratches; no luster in mold design; cross hatching is nearly worn off; hot stamp is still readable but much of the foil is missing.
Poor (P)	Edges that were formerly sharp and square, are now well worn bicycle tires; original hot stamp foil is mostly missing with only the recesses visible (may have to hold towards a light); moderate to large chips (nicks); surface cross hatching barely visible (if at all); severe scratches to inlay or chip surface; severe color fading; partial wear up to half of Chipco design from the edge to the center of the chip. Damage, such as cracks, breaks, missing inlay or other chip structure do not apply to this category.
Cancelled or Modified (Can) (Mod)	(Either by the manufacturer or the casino): A. Drilled, B. Notches, C. Overstamped, D. Clipped, E. Bent, F. Painted.
Damaged (Dam)	A. Severe nicks or chunks, B. Loose or missing inlay, C. Cracked, D. Broken, E. Warped, F. Permanent Stain, G. Severe Fading, H. Cigarette Burn(s). fire damage, I. Over-cleaning.

As well as the system for grading chips, there is also a system for identifying chips shown below:

Issue	The chronological order in which the chip was issued.
Denomination	Refers to the dollar amount of the chip.
Basic Color	The base color for most of the chip.
Mold	Identifies the look/manufacturer/distributor of the chip.
Inserts	The different color patterns used on its edge.
Inlay	Refers to the size and shape of the inlay, as well as composition and color.
Rarity	The best estimate of the number of surviving chips of its kind known to exist.

== Methods ==
There are many different ways to collect casino chips. Because of the amount of chips available and the increasing price of some, collectors have begun to specialize. A collector might choose to collect every chip from a certain casino or one from every Las Vegas casino. Collecting by denomination is also very popular, such as only $1 or $5 chips. The first rule of proper care and storage is to keep them away from sunlight and fluorescent light. The best way to store a collection is to keep them in a folder. As opposed to a coin collection, cleaning the chips will not decrease their value but is still not recommended unless really necessary. Chips have inlays and hot stamps on them which can get unreadable over the time if they are not maintained properly. The hot stamps and the inlays of the chips are what determine their value so it is very critical to ensure that these are not severely damaged while handling them. Collectors especially should be careful and maintain their rare chips effectively to keep their value intact.

== See also ==
- Casino token
- Jeton
