= Solo whist =

Card game

Solo Whist
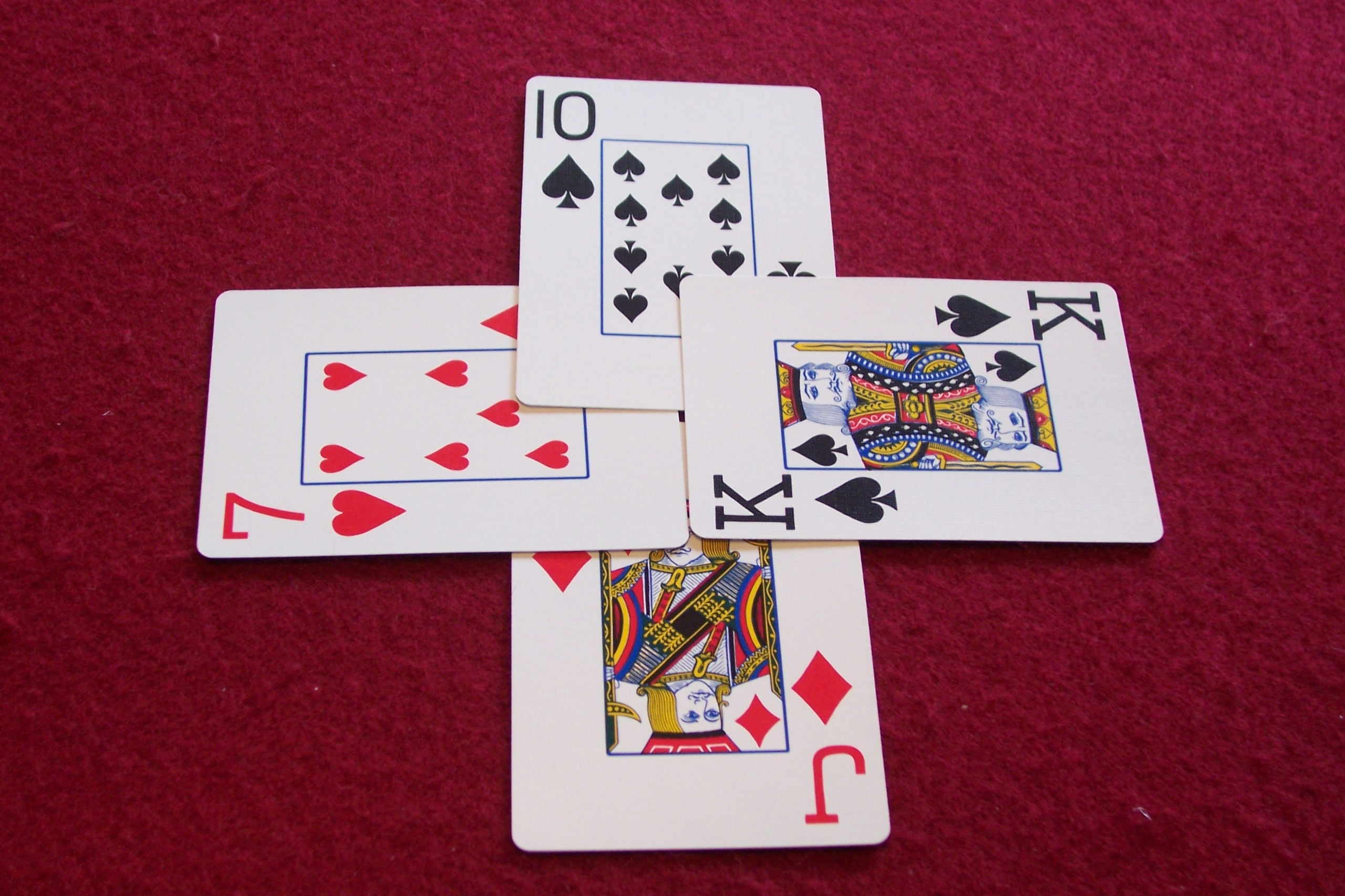
- Origin: England
- Alternative names: Solo
- Type: trick-taking
- Players: 4
- Cards: 52-card
- Deck: French-suited English pattern
- Rank (high→low): A K Q J 10 9 8 7 6 5 4 3 2
- Play: Clockwise

Related games
- Boston

Solo whist is the English form of Wiezen (Belgian or Ghent Whist), a simple game of the Boston family played in the Low Countries. It is a trick-taking card game for four players in which players can bid to make eight tricks in trumps with any partner, or a solo contract playing against the other three players. Thus it combines both partnership and cut-throat play. Scoring is with small stakes won or paid out on each hand.

== History ==
Wiezen or Belgian Whist, a simple form of Boston, has been played in the Low Countries since the early 19th Century. The game was introduced to London in 1852 by a family of Dutch Jews. It quickly became popular in London's Jewish Community and was known as Solo Whist. In the early 1870s Solo Whist was played as a low stakes gambling game in London's sporting clubs as a replacement for more complex and slower games like Whist.

Solo Whist continued to be played as a social gambling game in homes and pubs during the 20th Century in Britain, Australia and New Zealand, however, its popularity declined as Contract Bridge's rose.

== Dealing ==
The cards are shuffled by the dealer and cut by the player to dealer's right. Cards are usually dealt 3,3,3,3,1 with the last card to the dealer dealt face up to indicate the trump suit. Others deal with a rotating 4th card: 4333, 3433, 3343, 3334 or deal the cards singly as in Bridge.

== Bidding ==
Beginning with the player to dealer's left, each competitor may make one of the bids in the table below or pass. If someone bids, then subsequent players can either pass or bid higher. The bidding continues around the table as many times as necessary until the contract is settled. If everyone passes or there is a Prop without a Cop then the hands are thrown in and dealt again.

Call	Description	Proposer Points	Further notes
Prop and Cop	Two players attempt to win eight tricks together. The first player calling Prop and the remaining players invited to call Cop	+/- 1	Both proposer and accepter score.
Solo	One player attempts to make five tricks alone	+/- 3 (wins or loses one unit from other players)	
Misère	One player attempts to win no tricks	+/- 6 (wins or loses two units from other players)	There is no trump
Abundance	One player attempts to win nine tricks	+/- 9 (wins or loses three units from other players)	Proposer picks the trump
Royal Abundance	One player attempts to win nine tricks in the current trump	+/- 9 (wins or loses three units from other players)	
Misère Ouverte	One player attempts to win no tricks with their hand placed face up on the table after the first trick is complete	+/- 12 (wins or loses four units from other players)	There is no trump
Abundance Declared	One player attempts to win all 13 tricks with their hand placed face up on the table after the first trick is complete	+/- 18 (wins or loses six units from other players)	Proposer leads first. There is no trump

== Play ==
The player to the dealer's left leads the first trick, except in the case of an Abundance Declared in which case the bidder leads. Any card may be led and the other three players must follow suit where possible. A player with no card of the led suit may play a trump. If any trumps are played, then the trick is won by the highest trump card. If there are no trumps, it is won by the highest card in the suit that was led. The winner of the trick gets to lead to the next. Once a player has succeeded or failed in their bid, scores are adjusted. The deal then passes to the left and the next hand begins.

== Variations ==
=== Morris Fagelson ===
A common version of Solo played among the Jewish community in Essex and East London show the following differences:

- A Prop and Cop pairing need to win seven tricks. Players only get one bid, except the person to the dealer's left who is able to bid twice, although, if someone Props without a Cop, they still have the option to upgrade to a Solo no matter where they sit. The Proposer picks the trump in an Abundance Declared hand.

=== Straight Solo ===
- In this variation, Prop and Cop is eliminated and only individual hands are allowed.

=== High-scoring Solo ===
- To increase the proportion of distributional hands, some play that the cards are only lightly shuffled, shuffled only at the beginning, after a bid of abundance, or not shuffled at all. This can be enforced with 1 point penalty for shuffling inappropriately.

=== Different Trumps ===
- To avoid turning the dealer's last dealt card for trump, a second pack can be used for cutting Trumps. Like any form of Whist, Solo Whist can be played with rotating trumps: H, D, C, S as in Bridge Whist. No Trumps can be included in the rotation. Or the game can be played with a fixed Trump suit as in Spades.

=== Grand Slam Solo ===
- Uses rules for the Straight Solo and High-scoring Solo above, as well as the cyclical trump order described in "Different Trumps" above. Additionally, the "Abundance Declared" is replaced with two bids: A Petit Slam and a Grand Slam. The Petit Slam requires the bidder to make 12 tricks, and is scored above a Royal Abundance but below a Misère Ouverte. The Grand Slam, like an Abundance Declared, requires the bidder to make all 13 tricks, and ranks above all other bids. Both the Petit and Grand Slam bids allow the declarer to choose the trump suit.

=== Overtricks ===
- To spice up the game further, some play with a payment for overtricks in Prop and Cop, Solo and Abundance. In that case it is usual to set the basic score for a solo as four, five or six units, increasing the other scores in proportion. Each overtrick or undertrick in a Prop and Cop or Solo is worth an extra unit. In Abundance, overtricks gain an extra two units each, but undertricks cost only one unit each. There is no score for over or undertricks in Misère, Misère Ouverte or Abundance Declared.

=== Irish Solo ===
Solo Whist is not to be confused with Irish Solo, which is not related to Solo Whist, German Solo or Spanish Solo. It is a form of Cut-Throat Bid Whist for four players. The suit rankings are the same as Contract Bridge (NT,S,H,D,C) but the bids are for a number of tricks and denomination like in 500 or Preferans, not for odd tricks as in Bridge. So a bid of Six Spades is an undertaking to make six tricks and would be beaten by a bid of Six No Trumps or Seven Clubs. The winner of the auction is Declarer and plays solo against the other three players. A bid of Misère is an undertaking to win no tricks, and is equivalent in rank to a bid of 12 Tricks.

Pot betting is sometimes played, with the pot equal to an agreed stake multiplied by the number of tricks bid. If Declarer makes their contract they are paid 1/3 the value of the pot by each of the other three players. If they fail they pay out 1/3 of the Pot to each of the other players.

== In literature ==
In Robert W Service's poem "The Shooting of Dan McGrew", Dan McGrew is playing Solo in the back of the bar. His bid is "Spread Misère" (Misère Ouverte).

== Trivia ==
- The words "Misère", "Ouverte", "Grand", and "Petit" are French and mean misery, open, large, and small, respectively. The hands Royal Abundance and Abundance Declared are also known as Abundance Royale and Abundance Declaree; Abundance is sometimes nicknamed Bundle.

== See also ==
- Skat
- Ombre
- Boston
- Euchre
- Bridge

== Bibliography ==
- "Bird's Eye" (1881). Solo Whist. Manchester: John Heywood.
- _ (1883). The Rules of Solo Whist: Derived from the Best Authorities. Melbourne: Samuel Mullen.
- Ander, Tim (2018). How to Play Whist. ISBN 9781976880407
- Parlett, David (1991). A History of Card Games. Oxford, England: Oxford University Press. ISBN 0-19-282905-X.
- Hoffmann, Professor (1891). "Solo Whist" in The Cyclopædia of Card and Table Games. London: George Routledge. pp. 218–239.
- Wilks, Abraham S. (1894). "Solo Whist and its Rules" in The Whist Table, ed. by "Portland". NY: Charles Scribner's Sons. pp. 401–466.
- Wilks, Abraham S. (1898). The Handbook of Solo Whist. NY: Brentano.
- Wilks, Abraham S. and G. F. Pardon (c. 1888). How to Play Solo Whist. NY: Scribner & Welford's.
