= Boston (card game) =

Card game

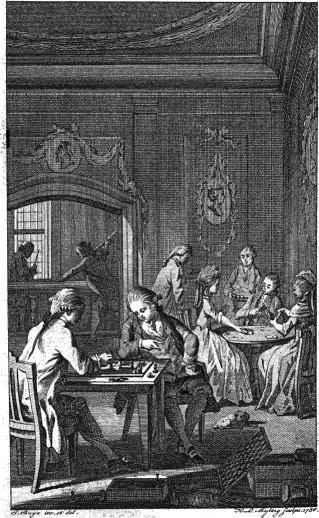
- The French Gambling Aristocracy
- Origin: France
- Family: Trick-taking
- Players: 4
- Skills: Strategy
- Cards: 52
- Deck: French
- Rank (high→low): A K Q J 10 9 8 7 6 5 4 3 2
- Play: Clockwise
- Playing time: 25 minutes
- Chance: Medium

Related games
- Whist

Bostogné, Boston or Boston Whist is an 18th-century trick-taking card game played throughout the Western world apart from Britain, forming an evolutionary link between Hombre and Solo Whist. Apparently named after a key location in the American War of Independence, it is probably a French game which was devised in France in the 1770s, combining the 52-card pack and logical ranking system of partnership Whist with a range of solo and alliance bids borrowed from Quadrille. Other lines of descent and hybridization produced the games of Twenty-five, Préférence and Skat. Its most common form is known as Boston de Fontainebleau or French Boston.

== History of the game ==
Two early forms of Boston, Le Whischt Bostonien and Le Mariland, are described in the Almanach des Jeux of 1783.

== Object ==
The object of the game is: a player pledges himself to perform a certain task, called an "announcement." The player who makes the highest announcement, if successful, wins the contents of the pool and a certain number of counters from each of the players.

== Play ==
The game of Boston, Boston De Fontainebleau or French Boston, whose appearance dates to around 1810, is played by four persons with a pack of 52 cards, which rank as in Whist. There are, moreover, four baskets or trays of different colors, one for each player, containing each five round counters (see jetons), which represent one hundred each; twenty short counters which represent fifties, and twenty long counters, which represent fives. The deal is decided by cutting, and the player cutting the lowest card deals. The cards are not shuffled by the dealer, but each player has the privilege of cutting the pack once, the dealer last. The deal is performed by giving each player four cards twice around, and then five, thus giving thirteen cards to each. Each dealer deposits one short counter of fifty in the pool for the privilege of dealing.

After the preliminaries of cutting and dealing have been concluded, eldest hand proceeds to make an announcement, or pass; the succeeding players have then, each in turn, the opportunity of outbidding or passing. Thus, if eldest hand aspires to make five tricks with Clubs for trump, he or she announces, "five in Clubs". But if the second player undertakes to make five tricks with Diamonds for trump, that player overcalls the first, and may in turn be outbid by the third engaging to get six or seven Levees (tricks), or play Little Misere. The fourth hand, or dealer, may also overcall third hand by announcing Picolissimo, or eight Levees, or any of the other chances lower down on the table. In short, whoever undertakes to do more than the other players has the preference. A player who has declined announcing once, cannot afterwards do so in that hand; but if a player makes an announcement, and it be exceeded by some other subsequent announcement, he or she may, in his regular turn, increase his first announcement if desired. If all pass without announcing, then the hand must be played, and the player who takes the fewest tricks wins the pool. In this hand there is no trump. Any player whose announcement proves to be the highest can, if desired, call for a partner. The privilege of calling for a partner extends only to announcements number 1, 2, 4, 6, 8 and 10; the other being bids to play solo.

The eldest hand leads first, and the hand is played and tricks taken in the same manner as at Whist, with the exception that partners play precisely in the order that they sit.

Honours in this game count the same as at Whist, but cannot be counted in as tricks bid, thus: if a player bids for eight tricks and only takes seven, the game is lost, even if four honours are held; but if the player succeeds in taking eight tricks, then the four honours added would entitle him the payment of twelve tricks. A player who wins his or her announcement, receives everything in the pool, and from each player the amount named in the table of payments, for instance: if five Levees in Hearts are announced, and two over are made, this would make seven and the player would then receive thirty from each opponent; but if the player had two by honours, that would make nine, and the player would receive forty from each opponent; but if seven in Hearts had been announced and made, and the player had two by honours, then the player would receive seventy from each opponent. In the same way, if seven in Hearts had been announced, and lost by two tricks, this would be nine, and two by honours would make it eleven lost, then the declarer would pay into the pool eighty, and the same to each player. The adversaries merely play to make the announcer lose, and therefore cannot, even if successful, win the pool, which stands over to the next hand. The pool can only be taken by a successful announcer; or, in the event of all having passed without announcement, it becomes the prize of the player who takes the fewest tricks.

== Bidding system ==
- The bids are, and rank as follows, beginning with the least:
1. Simple Boston - by this the player binds himself, if a certain suit, which he designates, become trumps, to win five tricks; or, if he can find a whister, or partner, to sustain him to win three additional, or in all, eight tricks. Whenever a player announces a certain number of levees, it must be understood that, should he avail himself of the assistance of a whister, he and the whister must, in order to take the pool, win three tricks more than the levees announced, and in all cases, losses and gains must be equally shared with the whister.
2. Six Levees - to win six tricks, upon the same condition in regard to trumps as above mentioned, i. e., six alone, or solo, or nine—three extra, sustained by a whister or partner.
3. Little Misere - not to win any tricks at all. Before commencing to play this call, each player must discard any one card he may choose from his hand and play with the remaining twelve only.
4. Seven Levees - to win seven tricks upon the same conditions as Simple Boston.
5. Picolissimo - to discard one card, as in Little Misere, and for the player to win neither more or less than one trick.
6. Eight Levees - to win eight tricks upon the same conditions as Simple Boston.
7. Grand Misere - without discarding any card, not to win a single trick.
8. Nine Levees - to win nine tricks upon the same conditions as Simple Boston.
9. Little Misere on the Table - played like Little Misere, only that the player must spread his hand upon the table, exposed to the view of the other three.
10. Ten Levees - to win ten tricks upon the same conditions as Simple Boston.
11. Grand Misere on the Table - played like Grand Misere, only that the player must spread his hand upon the table, as in nr. 9.
12. Eleven Levees - to name a trump, and win, unassisted, eleven tricks.
13. Twelve Levees - to win twelve tricks.
14. Chelem, or Grand Boston - an announcement of the whole thirteen tricks.
15. Chelem, or Grand Boston on the Table - same as nr. 14, the player spreading out his cards on the table, as explained in nr. 9.
- Note: In each of the announcements (excepting of course Nr: 3, 5, 7 9 and 11, in which there is no trump suit), the designated trump suits rank and take precedence as follows: First, Diamonds; next Hearts; then Clubs; and lowest of all, Spades.

== Rules ==
1. The deal is decided by cutting, and the player who cuts the lowest card deals. Ace is lowest, and ties cut over. After the first game, the deal passes to each player in succession to the left.
2. The cards are not shuffled, but each player has the privilege of a cut, the dealer last.
3. Each player who deals must deposit a short check of fifty in the pool for the deal.
4. The cards are dealt four at a time twice round, and then five, which distributes the pack.
5. Should the dealer make a misdeal, the deal is not forfeited, but the dealer must deposit another fifty in the pool as penalty, and deal again, unless either of the other players touch their cards, or the pack be faulty, in which cases the dealer deals again without penalty.
6. If a player once decline to announce, that player cannot afterwards do so in that hand; this does not debar him from assisting as whister if called on.
7. If a player make an announcement which is superseded by another, the first bidder can, when his turn comes round again, augment his bid.
8. If all pass, the hand is played without any trump, and the player who takes the fewest tricks wins the pool.
9. If a player make a revoke, that player's side forfeits three tricks to the opposing side.
- A revoke is established according to the rules of Whist.
- A card led or played out of turn, is treated as an exposed card, and subject to the laws of Whist in a similar case.

== Variants ==
=== Le Whisch Bostonien ===
The last card is turned up for trump and no other suit may be nominated. The lowest bid is a Demande, equivalent to Ask-Leave, to win five tricks solo. To this, any other player may call je soutiens (I support), thereby allying themselves with the bidder in a contract to win at least eight tricks between them. The higher bid of Independence offers to win at least eight tricks playing solo. In either way, there is an extra bonus for winning all thirteen tricks formerly called la vole, but now le chelem, from English "Slam".

=== Mariland ===
All bids are solo, the lowest being to take four tricks in any suit. Each may be over-called by bidding a higher number of tricks, or the same number in a better suit. For this purpose a better suit is that of Preference, previously determined by turning the last card of the deal, and best of all is Superpreference, which for the whole session remains the suit turned for Preference upon the first deal.

=== American Boston ===
American Boston is a game for 4 players in two partnerships with 2 packs of 52 cards. The cards are never shuffled; one of the packs is dealt, and the other cut alternately to determine the trump, which governs the game. The dealer deals 5 cards to each player twice, and 3 the last time around. If the first player can make 5 tricks, he says: "I go Boston" and his competitors may overbid him by saying: "I go 6, 7, 8, 9,10, 11,12, or 13", as the hand of each may warrant. Should either of them fail to make the number of tricks he bids for, he must pay to each competitor a forfeit regulated by a card of prices, which must he prepared beforehand.

=== Russian Boston ===
Played as in Boston de Fontainebleau, except that a player who does not hold trump may declare "chicane" before play, and collect two chips from each of the other players. This variation differs slightly from Boston De Fontainebleau, with Diamonds, not Hearts as the preferred suit.

=== Boston de Nantes ===
An apparent compound of the original Boston and Mariland, which appeared around the turn of the 19th century. With two preferred suits: Belle for permanent and Petite for each deal, it also features the addition of the Jack ♦ known as the "carte de boston", or simply Boston, as a permanent top trump. It contains the bids of Proposal, which may be accepted by another player, and Solo, for playing alone.

== Literature ==
- The game Kirila Petrovich plays in section 12 of Alexander Pushkin's unfinished novel 'Dubrovsky'.
- Boston is a favorite pastime of Count Rostov in Leo Tolstoy's novel War and Peace.
- The Boston Club was named after the card game Boston in 1842, and is referenced in Walker Percy's The Moviegoer
- Boston is mentioned by Balzac as a pastime that Byron would have been too passionate to indulge in within his breakthrough novel, La peau de chagrin (1831).
- Boston is mentioned by Mikhail Lermontov in the final chapter of his novel A Hero of Our Time.
- Boston is briefly mentioned in Nikolai Gogol's literary classic Dead Souls, wherein the protagonist Chichikov is invited to play a game of Boston with a town official.
- Boston is also mentioned in Gogol's short story "The Nose" (1836).
- French Boston is referenced in Chapter 11 of Annie Proulx's The Shipping News (1993).

== See also ==
- Bridge
- Préférence
- Quadrille
- Reversis
- Whist
