= Ombre =

Trick-taking card game

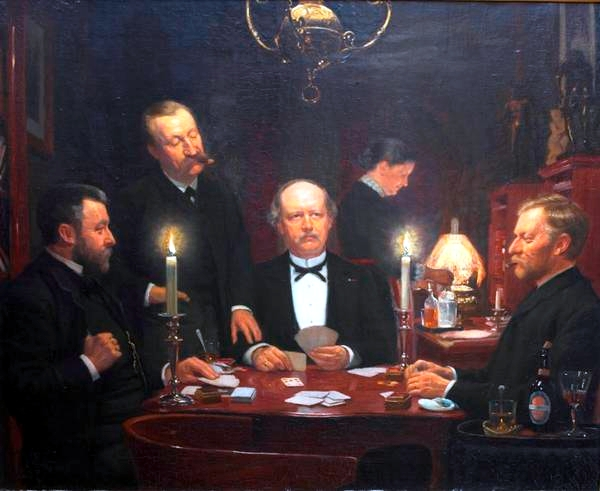
- L'Hombre (1887), a painting by Malthe Odin Engelstedt. The player in the center is Rasmus Malling-Hansen, Danish inventor of an early typewriter.
- Origin: Spain
- Alternative names: Hombre, Lomber
- Type: Trick-taking
- Players: 3 (4–5)
- Skills: Tactics and strategy
- Cards: 40 cards
- Deck: Spanish
- Play: Counter-clockwise
- Playing time: 20 min.
- Chance: Difficult

Related games
- Mensch • Quadrille • Solo • Tresillo • Zanga • Bête

Ombre or omber (from Spanish hombre 'man'), also called l'Hombre, is a fast-moving seventeenth-century trick-taking card game for three players. It has been described as "the most successful card game ever invented."

Its history began in Spain around the end of the 16th century as a four-person game. It is one of the earliest card games known in Europe and by far the most classic game of its type, directly ancestral to Euchre, Boston and Solo Whist. Despite its difficult rules, complicated point score and strange foreign terms, it swept Europe in the last quarter of the 17th century, becoming Lomber and L'Hombre in Germany, Lumbur in Austria and Ombre (originally pronounced 'umber') in England, occupying a position of prestige similar to contract bridge today. Ombre eventually developed into a whole family of related games such as the four-hand Quadrille, three-hand Tritrille, five-hand Quintille and six-hand Sextille, as well as German Solo, Austrian Préférence and Swedish Vira, itself "one of the most complex card games ever devised." Other games borrowed features from Ombre such as bidding; for example, the gambling game of Bête, formerly known as Homme, and the tarot game of Taroc l'Hombre.

== History ==
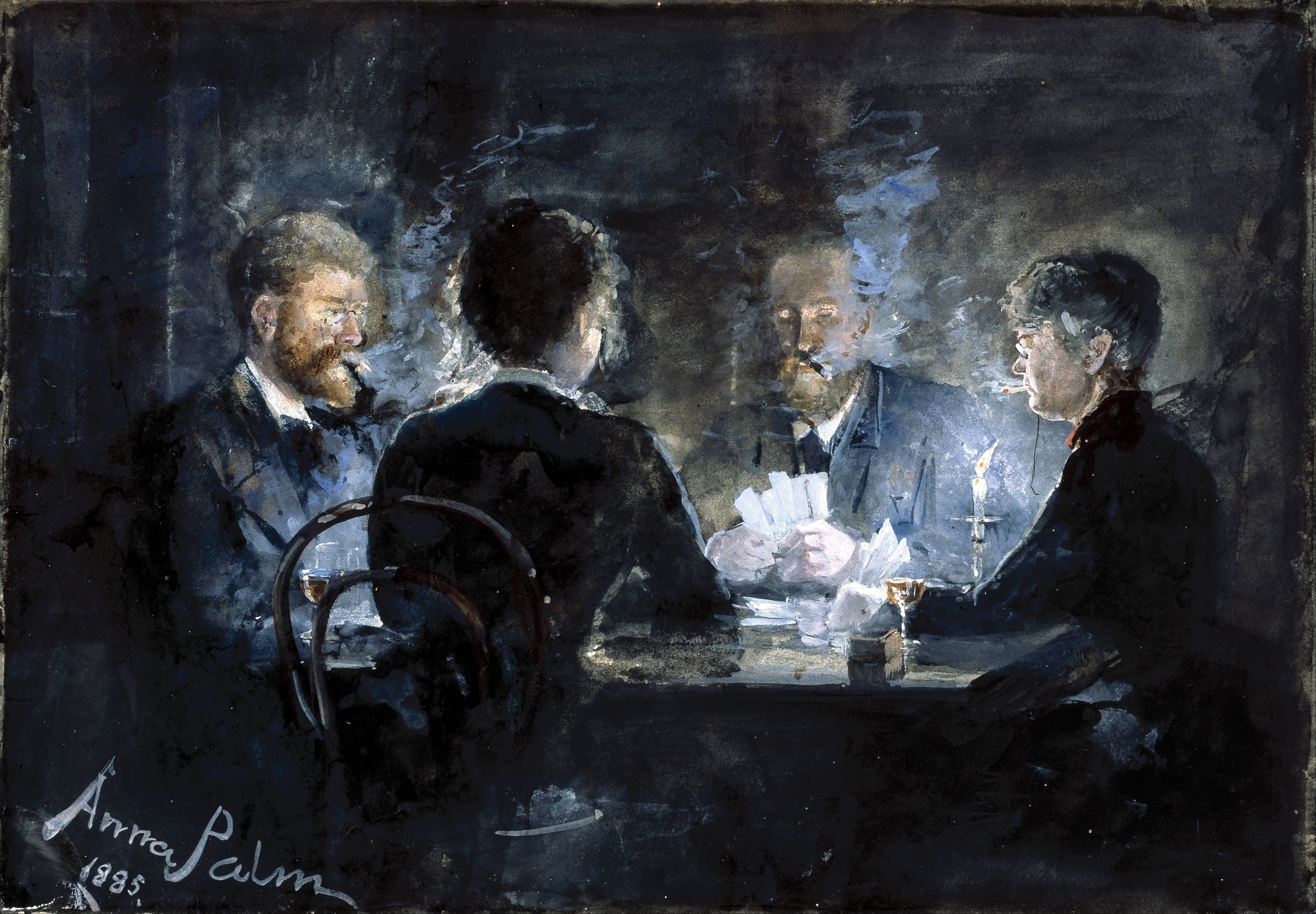
A Game of L'hombre in Brøndum's Hotel by Swedish artist Anna Palm de Rosa, circa 1885

The historical importance of Ombre in the field of playing cards is the fact that it was the first card game in which a trump suit was established by bidding rather than by the random process of turning the first card of the stock. This game developed from Triunfo, though it was from L'Hombre that the idea of bidding was adopted into other card games such as Skat, and Tarot, which owes Hombre a good portion of its betting system as well.

Ombre's precise origins are unknown, but it reached England and France at about the same time. The earliest French reference dates to 1671 and it is recorded in England as early as 1661 with a set of rules being published in 1662. The game continued to be in vogue in almost every corner of Europe from the late 17th through the 18th centuries.

As with most games, Ombre acquired many variations of increasing complexity over the years, until its popularity was eclipsed by the second quarter of the 18th century by a new four player French variant called Quadrille, later displaced by the English Whist. Other lines of descent and hybridization produced three-handed games like Preference and four-handed ones such as German Solo and Mediateur. Under the name Tresillo, it survived in parts of Spain during the nineteenth century, as Voltarete in Portugal and Brazil, as Rocambor in countries such as Bolivia, Peru, and Colombia in the twentieth century, and it is still played as L'Hombre in Denmark, mostly in Jutland and on the island of Funen, where it is organized by the Danish Hombre Union (Dansk L'hombre-Union), as well as in the Faroe Islands (as Lumbur) and Iceland (as Lomber). Today, Tresillo survives in Spain and Rocambor is still reported in South America (Bolivia and Peru). It may still exist in Portugal under the name Mediator.

Daines Barrington, English antiquary and naturalist, says that Ombre was probably introduced in England by Catherine of Braganza, the Queen of Charles II, as Edmund Waller, the court poet, had a poem entitled "On a Card Torn at Ombre by the Queen". She was such a keen player, as were so many members of English high society by the end of 1674, that the Lower House of Parliament proposed to pass an Act against the playing of Ombre, or at least to limit the stakes at £5, a proposition received as "ridiculous" at that time. But a small book of rules, The Royal game of the ombre written at the request of divers honourable persons, published in London in 1660, would support the inference that the game was known in England before the Restoration.

In the late 18th century, the three player version of its offshoot, German Solo, was often referred to as German Ombre (Dütsch Lumber or Deutsche L'Hombre), a game popular with "the lower classes" in northern Germany.

== Etymology ==
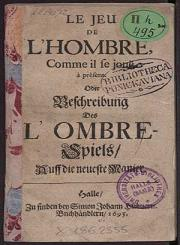
Le Jeu de L'Hombre (1695).

Ombre takes its name from the Spanish phrase originally used by the player who declared trumps: Yo soy el hombre, i.e., "I am the man". It appears to be merely an alteration of the game Primero and it is to be presumed that it was invented prior to the publication of the Dictionary of Sebastián de Covarrubias in 1611, although it makes no mention of it. The spelling changed from "Hombre" to "Ombre" in English due to a misunderstanding that the name came from the French ombre meaning "shadow."

Cotton's Compleat Gamester says that "there were several sorts of this game, but that which the chief was called "Renegado", at which three only could play, and to whom were dealt nine cards apiece so that by discarding the eights, nines and tens, there would remain thirteen cards in the stock". Seymour's The Compleat Gamester (1722) contains a frontispiece representing a party of rank playing it and describes it as a game so much in fashion that at its peak by the turn of the eighteenth century it inspired a unique form of furniture: a three-sided card table. According to Jean-Baptiste Bullet, writer and professor of divinity at the University of Besançon, the Spaniards, occasionally also called the game "Manilla" after the name of the second matador, a word signifying a slayer in Spanish.

== Summary ==
Ombre is a three-handed game in which a single player, originally known as Ombre or l'Hombre (the man), plays against his two opponents. The game is traditionally played with a forty-card Spanish-suited deck with suits of coins and cups (round) and swords and clubs (long), but when it spread to Northern Europe French-suited cards with suits of diamonds and hearts (red) and spades and clubs (black) were usually substituted.

Once the cards are dealt, players bid for the right to choose what suit will be trumps. The trump maker (Ombre) undertakes to win more tricks than either of the other players, and wins the pool if successful. If an opponent of the Ombre wins the most tricks the Ombre pays that opponent. If there is a tie for most tricks the Ombre pays into the pool. There are additional payments for various feats such as winning all the tricks (Vole).

== Ombre Renegado ==
By the 17th century, when it caught on outside Spain, most people were playing a three-player variation called "Renegado" first described in 1663 in Madrid. The terms used were those in English, which were anglicized versions of French versions of the original Spanish words.

=== Deck ===
Traditionally, a Spanish 40-card deck is used, but a French-suited deck may be substituted in which case spades correspond to swords, clubs to clubs, hearts to cups and diamonds to coins. The eights, nines and tens can be stripped out of a standard 52-card deck to make a suitable 40-card deck.

=== Rank of cards ===
The rank of the cards in the game depends on whether a black (long) or a red (round) suit is chosen as trumps. The basic ranking of numerals is reversed in red suits, being 7 low; and a red suit is always one card longer than a black one of the same status, whether trump or plain.

The black aces are permanent trumps, and the top three trumps are called matadors or estuches:

1. A♠ (spadille)
2. black 2 or red 7 (manille)
3. A♣ (basto)

When a red suit is trumps, the fourth highest trump is the A♥, or A♦, called "punto", but it does not have the status of a matador.

If the trump suit is black:	A♠	2	A♣		K	Q	J		7	6	5	4	3		(11 cards)
In a plain black suit:					K	Q	J		7	6	5	4	3	2	(9 cards)
If the trump suit is red:	A♠	7	A♣	A	K	Q	J		2	3	4	5	6		(12 cards)
In a plain red suit:					K	Q	J	A	2	3	4	5	6	7	(10 cards)

=== Deal ===
Whoever draws the highest card from the deck becomes the dealer; the turn to deal and play rotates counter-clockwise. Before play, the dealer antes five chips to the pool, deals nine cards in batches of three, and places the remaining thirteen face down on the playing surface to form the stock, or talon.

=== Bid ===
Whoever bids highest becomes Ombre, chooses trumps, and seeks to win more tricks than either opponent individually. Thus, five or more wins, and four wins if the others split three-two. The possible bids are, from low to high:

1. Entrada: Ombre announces trumps, discards, and draws replacements from the stock.
2. Vuelta: Ombre turns the top card of the stock to determine trumps, discards and draws.
3. Solo: Ombre announces trumps, but plays without discarding and drawing.

In turn, each player may pass or bid, and having passed cannot bid again. Each bid must be higher than the last. However, a player who has made a lower bid, and not yet passed, may raise his bid to equal that of the previous player, unless overcalled again. Unless playing Solo, Ombre may discard as many cards as he likes before drawing the same number from the stock. Solo or not, both opponents may then discard and draw for themselves. As it is advantageous for one of the defenders to have the stronger hand, they may agree as to which is to exchange first. Whoever does so may draw any number of cards up to eight. Rules vary considerably as to whether any untaken cards are left down or turned face up, and the point should be agreed before play.

=== Play ===
Eldest leads first and the winner of each trick leads to the next. The trick is taken by the highest card of the suit led or by the highest trump if any are played. Normally, suit must be followed if possible, otherwise any card may be played. Matadors, however, can only be forced by higher matadors, not by lower ones or trumps. That is, if the player's only trumps are matadors he need not follow to a trump, but may discard ("Renege") instead. However, if a higher matador is led, and his only trump is a lower one, he is obliged to play it.

If Ombre takes the first five tricks straight off, he can claim the game won without need for further play. If instead he leads to the sixth, he thereby obligates himself to win all nine ("Vole"), thus increasing his potential winnings or penalties. If Ombre thinks he cannot win, he may surrender at any time before playing to the fourth trick, but he may not do this if playing a "Solo". In a "Vuelta", his surrender must be accepted by both opponents. However, if the game played was "Entrada", either opponent may himself take over the role of Ombre and play the rest of the hand as if he had made the bid himself.

=== Scoring ===
There are three possible outcomes, which are:

1. Sacada: Ombre wins more tricks than any other player. Ombre takes the pool.
2. Puesta: There is a tie for most tricks. Ombre pays the pool, as described under Penalties.
3. Codille: One opponent wins more tricks than any other player. Ombre pays the winning opponent as described under Penalties.

If the Ombre wins, in addition to collecting the pool he is paid by each opponent.

1. Entrada: Value of 5 chips.
2. Vuelta: Value of 7 chips.
3. Solo: Value of 15 chips, plus any of the following bonuses:
  - Vole: To win nine tricks, value of 25 chips (5 from the pot and 10 from each player).
  - Primeras: To win the first five tricks and stop, value of 3 chips.
  - Estuches: Extra payment when holding or lacking at least the top three trumps, value of 1 each. (Note: Estuches are the top consecutive trumps from "Spadille" downwards. If the Ombre wins holding the top four trumps, but not the fifth, he would make 4 extra: if he lost he would pay four extra. The same applies if he had been playing against at least the top three trumps. If he had won the game holding the King of a black trump suit, but not "Spadille", "Manille" or "Basto", he would win 3 for "Estuches".)

=== Penalties ===
If Ombre loses "Puesta", he doubles the pool and pays five chips for each player in the game. If Ombre loses "Codille", he pays the same as for a "Puesta", but to the player who won instead of to the pot. These penalties are further increased as described above for "Primeras", and if he loses the first five tricks, and "Estuches", he pays one per each consecutive trump. If Ombre fails to win all nine tricks after leading to the sixth, he pays 30 to each opponent, less 2 if he played "Vuelta", and 10 if he played Solo, less also the number of "Estuches" applicable.

=== Rule variations ===
==== Gascarola ====
If all pass immediately, lower bids may be made so as to avoid a redeal. They include:

- Voltereta: is a game equivalent to "Entrada", where Ombre turns the first card of the stock for trump, discards and draws up to 5 cards to complete the hand. If the turned-up card is Spadilla, the game then counts as "Vuelta"
- Gascarola: gascarille, cascarilla, cascarola, casco, casca, is an implement on the rules of the game. If all three players pass, each player in turn may bid "casca". If the auction is won by a "Gascarola" bid, the declarer then takes eight cards from the stock, chooses one of his own cards to supplement the eight, but he also has the option to discard all nine and take nine others from the stock. Based on his hand, he names a trump suit. The defenders then exchange with the remaining five or four cards in the stock, and an "Entrada" contract is played and scored normally.

==== Vole ====
Vole, Contrabola: No one discards, Hombre announces a trump suit of which he holds at least one, and aims to lose every trick. If successful, he wins as if the game was "Entrada", if not it counts as "Puesta".

Spadille Forcé, Force Spadille: if all pass without bidding, whoever holds "Spadille" or "Basto", must take the role as Ombre, or by eldest if no one does. He discards up to 8 cards, draws replacements from the stock and then announces trumps. The game counts as "Entrada".

=== Terminology ===
- Basto - the third highest matador.
- Casca - a bid in the related Portuguese game Voltarete.
- Codillo - the Ombre loses, opponents win.
- Entrada - to announce trumps, discard, and draw from the stock.
- Estuches - the 3 top cards of the game.
- Force Spadille, (Spadille Forcé) - the game where one of the players holds "Spadille" or "Basto".
- Gano - "I'll take it" or "let the card pass" (lit. "I win") - instruction to co-defender. Also "demanding Gano", "making Gano".
- Manille - the second highest matador.
- Mort - the form of the game played with a fourth player.
- Null (Contrabola) - to lose all nine tricks.
- Ombre - "declarer", the player who chooses trumps and then tries to win most tricks.
- Primeras - to win the first five tricks.
- Puesta - the Ombre loses, tricks are tied.
- Punto - the red Ace of the trump suit.
- Renege - to fail to follow suit.
- Sacada - the Ombre wins.
- Solo - to announce trumps, without discarding and drawing.
- Spadille - the highest matador.
- Vole (Bola) - to win all nine tricks.
- Voltareta - a bid in the related Portuguese game Voltarete.
- Vuelta - to turn the top card of the stock for trump, discards and draws.

== Game variations ==
=== Two-handed Ombre ===
Ombre may be played sometimes by two players, for lack of a third person. It is played exactly as for three hands, but a whole suit is removed from the pack, either Diamonds or Hearts, so that 30 cards remain. Deal eight cards in batches of 2's and stock the remaining 12 on the table. Ombre may take as many cards as he wants up to eight and the other player may take the rest. When the trump is named, the player is paid for Matadors. Ombre is intended to make five tricks to win the stake. If the tricks are divided by four, the game is then considered "Remise". If the other player makes five, he wins by "Codille".

=== Four-handed Ombre ===
In this variation, first described in 1669 in Zaragoza, usually only three players are active at a time. The player opposite the dealer sits out, but takes part in the payment after the play as though he were a defender. If three players pass, the fourth player picks up all 13 cards from the stock and discards four. He chooses trump then and plays as declarer against the other three, who cannot exchange any cards, since the stock is already used up. The contract counts as "Entrada". This version was also played in Germany where the fourth player was called the King (König) or, in Low German, the "one who sits still" (Stillsitter).

=== Five-handed Ombre ===
In this five-handed variation called Cinquillo, first described around 1683, the players are dealt eight cards each, after staking down a fifth to the pool, therefore no discard is possible. Bidding may be for Ask Leave, when Ombre calls a king seeking for a partner. If the first four players pass, the fifth may play Solo. Ombre is obliged to win five tricks, otherwise he loses. He names trump and if between them five tricks can be won, Ombre wins, sharing between them two-thirds of the pool for Ombre and one-third for his partner. If they both make only three tricks the game is Remise, and Ombre is to lay down two-thirds of the pool and his partner one.

== Poetry ==
The game of Ombre is Belinda's game in Alexander Pope's poem The Rape of the Lock, written in 1714. (Note: The Rape of the Lock, canto III, lines 95–100.)

An Ace of Hearts steps forth: The King unseen
Lurk'd in her hand, and mourn'd his captive Queen:
He springs to Vengeance with an eager pace,
And falls like thunder on the prostrate Ace.
The nymph exulting fills with shouts the sky;
The walls, the woods, and long canals reply

The progress of the game is described in such detail that Lord Aldenham was able to reconstruct the exact deal and play of the cards.

It is also mentioned in Alexander Pushkin's Eugene Onegin.

== See also ==
- Spoil Five

== Literature ==
- "Tresillio, or, The Modern Game of Ombre". The Westminster Papers. Vol. 6. 1 October 1873. pp. 120–127.
- Depaulis, Thierry (1987).
  - "Ombre et Lumière. Un Peu de Lumiére sur L'hombre (1)" in The Playing-Card XV (4), May 1987. ISSN 0305-2133. pp. 101–110.
  - "Un Peu de Lumiére sur L'hombre (2)" in The Playing-Card XVI (1), August 1987. ISSN 0305-2133. pp. 10–18.
  - "Un Peu de Lumiére sur L'hombre (3)" in The Playing-Card XVI (2), November 1987. ISSN 0305-2133. pp. 44–53.
- Dummett, Michael (1980). The Game of Tarot. London: Duckworth. ISBN 0-7156-1014-7.
- Parlett, David (2008). The Penguin Book of Card Games. London: Penguin. ISBN 978-0-141-03787-5.
- Schütze, Johann Friedrich (1800). Holsteinisches Idiotikon. Hamburg: Heinrich Ludwig Villaume.
- Schwetschke, Dr. Karl Gustav [in German] (1863). Geschichte des L'Hombre [History of Ombre] (in German). Halle: G. Schwetschke.
