= Quadrille (card game) =

Card game of the Ombre family

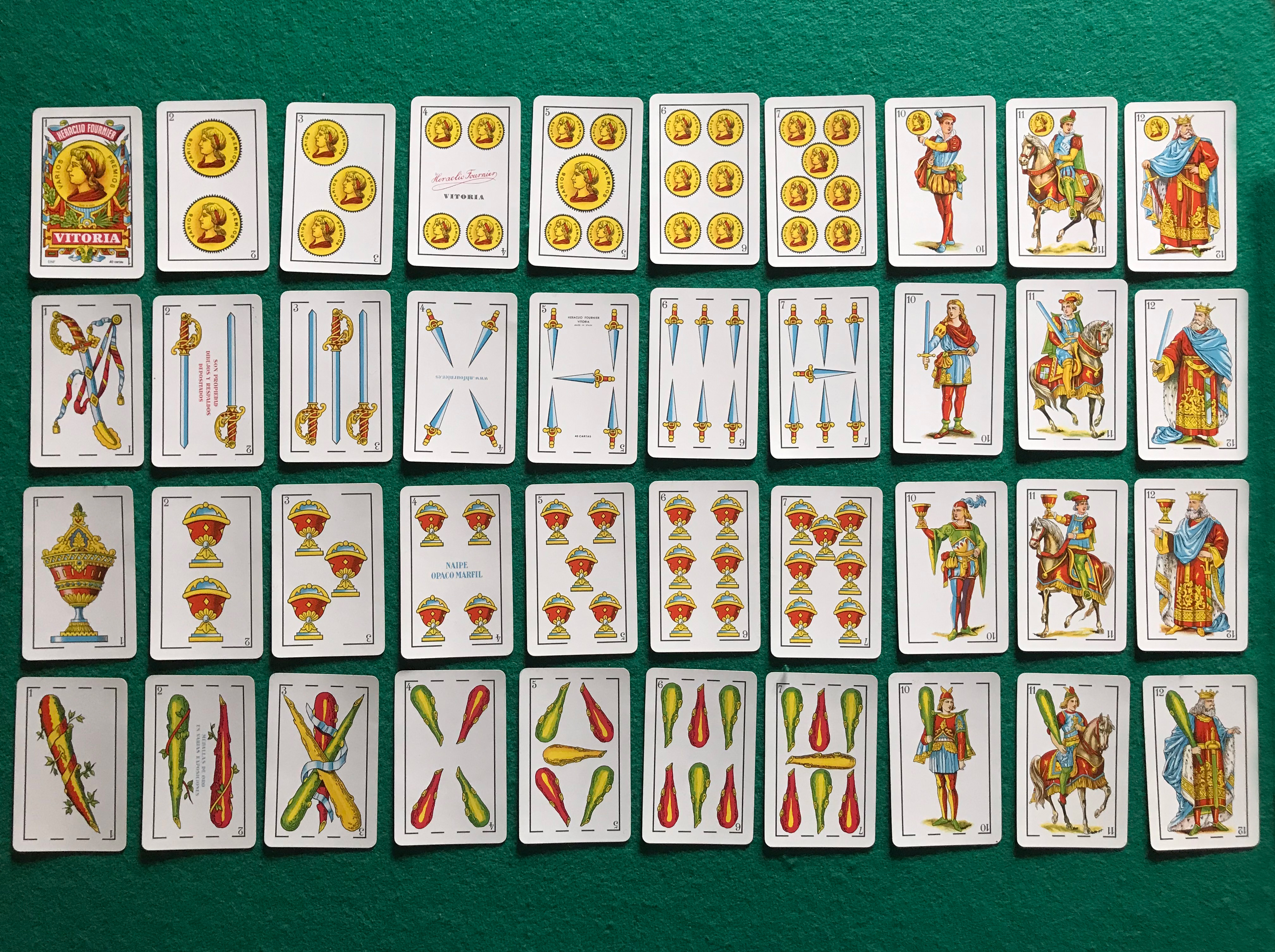
Castilian pattern introduced by Heraclio Fournier

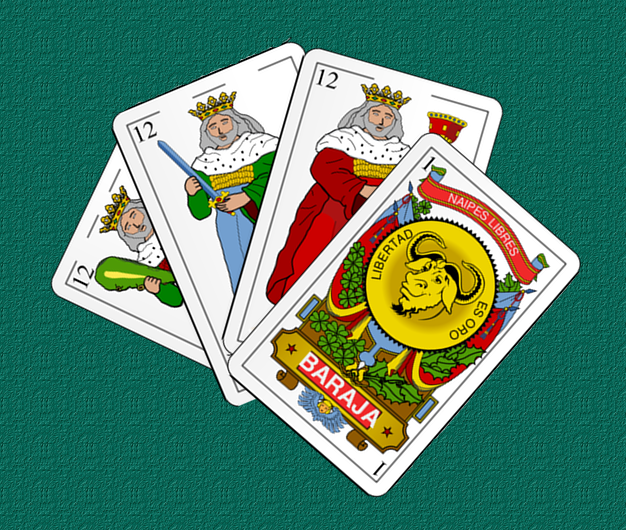
Spanish playing cards may originally have been used in Ombre

Quadrille is a four-player trick-taking game of the Ombre family, played with a forty-card pack. Its lowest contract creates a concealed partnership between the declarer and the holder of a called King; its higher contracts are played alone against the other three players. Every deal is played, six of the ten tricks are required for victory, and the game uses permanent trumps headed by Spadille, the Ace of spades.

The form ordinarily called Quadrille in English corresponds to the later French game called Médiateur. The older French game named Quadrille was its direct ancestor, lacked both the favourite suit and the King-exchange contract, and is now chiefly of historical interest. The later form is therefore treated as the ordinary English game throughout this article; the older form and its differences are described at the end.

Quadrille developed in France at the end of the seventeenth century and became fashionable at the French court and among the British upper and middle classes, particularly women.

== History and reception ==
A contemporary account dates the introduction of Quadrille to the southern provinces of France to about 1695 and states that it reached Paris and most other provinces several years later. The earliest known English rules appeared in 1720 as The Game of Quadrille; or Ombre by Four, a work presenting the game as a recent French import and the favourite game of the French court. A French treatise, Les Jeux de Quadrille et de Quintille, followed in 1724 and remarked that no one had yet collected the rules despite the game's rapid spread.

The later form was published in 1752 as Les Règles du Médiateur. It retained the ordinary structure of four-handed Ombre but added the favourite suit and the intermediate solo contract in which a called King is exchanged. English writers continued to use the older name Quadrille for the game as a whole; the exchange contract was also called Dimidiator or Commutation.

Quadrille appears repeatedly in eighteenth- and early nineteenth-century diaries and literature. In Jane Austen's Pride and Prejudice, Lady Catherine de Bourgh and her guests play it on several occasions. Thomas Vernon recorded frequent games while exiled in Rhode Island during the American Revolution, and James Woodforde also mentioned it often in his diary. In Ireland, a Dublin pamphlet ostensibly proposing new rules caused controversy in 1736 when it proved to be a political attack by Archbishop Josiah Hort upon Richard Bettesworth MP.

The game requires strict silence from players and spectators. Because the partner in a simple call is initially unknown, a word, gesture, or conspicuous movement may reveal allegiance or alter the choice of card. The rule is especially important when the declaring side is considering the vole.

The central device of the called King used in Quadrille is an almost exact parallel to that used in Königrufen; the method of account is much like Grosstarock; and cards rank as in L'Hombre, of which this is a variation.

== Rules ==
The following rules are summarised from "Quanti" (1822).

=== Players and cards ===
Quadrille is played by four players using a pack of 40 Quadrille cards made by removing the 8s, 9s and 10s from a Whist pack. Thus the ranking of the cards in the black suits is K > Q > Kn > 7 > 6 > 5 > 4 > 3 > 2. However, in the red suits, for historical reasons, the order of the pip cards is reversed: K > Q > Kn > A > 2 > 3 > 4 > 5 > 6 > 7.

The Ace of Spades is called Spadille and is always the highest trump. The Ace of Clubs is called Basta and is always the third highest trump. Thus when a red suit is entrumped, there are twelve trumps and when a black suit is entrumped, eleven. The second highest trump, Manille, is always the lowest card of its suit, a Deuce in the black suits and a 7 in the red suits. The fourth highest trump is called Ponto and is the Ace in red suits or the King in black suits.

=== Aim ===
The player who wins the auction becomes the Hombre ("The Man") or declarer, names the trump suit and aims to make six of the ten tricks.

=== Stakes ===
Originally, each player anted an agreed stake in counters or fishes to the pool at the start of each deal. Later, four stakes were anted by the dealer alone. If successful, Hombre wins the pool; if unsuccessful Hombre becomes the Beast, is said to be beasted, must double the pool and pay what would have been earned by winning.

=== Deal ===
The dealer shuffles the pack and places it down in front of the player to the left for cutting. After the cut, the dealer deals the whole pack around to the right and in 3 rounds of 3, 3 and 4 cards, being free to deal the 4-card round first, second or last. The deal rotates to the right during the game.

=== Auction ===
There is then an auction in which players bid for the following contracts in ascending order:

- Alliance. The declarer names trumps and plays with the aid of a partner. The declarer calls a non-trump King and the owner of that card becomes the partner, but may not reveal this except by the play of the cards. Holding all four Kings, the declarer calls a non-trump Queen. They aim to make six tricks between them.
- Dimidiator. The declarer calls for a card, usually a King, and exchanges a card with the player holding the King. The declarer names trumps and plays alone aiming to make six tricks. (Note: Dimidiator was also called Commutation and, erroneously, Mediator.)
- Casco. May be called when the player has both black Aces, Spadille and Basta, in hand. It is bid by placing them both on the table and saying "Casco" or "Respect". The declarer calls a King and the called player names trumps.
- Solo. The declarer plays alone, names trumps and aims to take six tricks. (Note: Solo was also called Sans Prendre.)

If all pass a Forced Spadille is played in which the player holding Spadille becomes the Hombre and nominates a partner by calling a King. Hombre may name trumps or leave that privilege to the partner. The declarer's team aims to make six tricks. They may not go for a vole. (Note: Forced Spadille was also called Spadille by Compulsion or Spadille Compelled.)

Eldest opens the auction by saying "I pass" or bidding a contract.

Quanti mentions that, in some circles, the additional contracts of Grandissimo and Nemo are added, "forming a pleasing diversity". Another recent addition was the concept of a favourite suit. Parlett sees these, along with Dimidiator and Casco, as forming the elaboration of Quadrille known as Mediateur.

=== Play ===
Eldest hand leads to the first trick. Players must follow suit; otherwise may play any card. The trick is won by the highest trump or the highest card of the suit led if no trumps are played.

An exception is that Spadille, Manille and Basta have the privilege that they may be held back when trumps are led, even if they are the only trump a player has in hand; this privilege is only waived if a higher trump is led. Thus if Spadille is led, neither Manille nor Basta may be withheld.

=== Settlement ===
The following rates assume the basic stake is four units.

==== Hombre wins ====
- Alliance: the declaring team divide the pool and earn any honours due. The opponents receive nothing. There is no premium.
- Dimidiator is paid at half the Solo rate i.e. one unit.
- Casco: both players share the winnings or losses and the premium is the same as for Solo, one opponent paying the Hombre and the other paying Hombre's partner. A vole is not excluded.

Solo: the declarer sweeps the pool and is paid the Solo premium as well as honours, matadors and premiers where applicable. The Solo premium is usually equivalent to a double stake and is paid by each opponent to the declarer if he wins.

- Forced Spadille: the declaring team divide the pool and the opponents receive nothing. If lost, they share the penalty. There is no premium.

In addition to the game payments there are three bonus payments:

- Matadors. If the three highest matadors (trumps) are held by the same side at the start, one unit is earned.
- Double Matadors. If the four highest matadors are held by the same side at the start, two units are paid.
- Premiers. If Hombre or Hombre's team make six tricks before the opponents take one, they are paid for Premiers at the same rate as Matadors.

==== Hombre loses ====
If Hombre loses with five tricks, this is Remise; the loser(s) double the pool which becomes a triple stake in the next deal. If Hombre makes four or fewer tricks, it is Codille; The opponents share the pool if it contains a triple stake and the penalty for Hombre is double that of Remise.

== Bibliography ==
- Anonymous (1720). The Game of Quadrille; or Ombre by Four. London: Francklin. 2nd ed., 1728.
- Anonymous (1724). Les Jeux de Quadrille et de Quintille. Paris: Théodore Le Gras.
- Diderot, Denis (1765). “Quadrille (Jeu)”, in Encyclopédie, ou Dictionnaire raisonné des sciences, des arts et des métiers, vol. XIII.
- Jordan, Claude; La Barre, Louis-François-Joseph de; Monthenault d'Egly, Charles-Philippe de; Bonamy, Pierre Nicolas; and Ameilhon, Hubert-Pascal, eds. (1722). Journal Historique sur les Matières du Temps, vol. 11. Paris and Rouen: Herault.
- M.V.D. (1752). Les Règles du Médiateur. Paris: Delaguette and Duchesne.
- Quanti, Q. (pseud.) (1822). Quadrille Elucidated. Cheltenham: G. A. Williams.
