= Chinese numismatic charm =

Decorative coins used for rituals

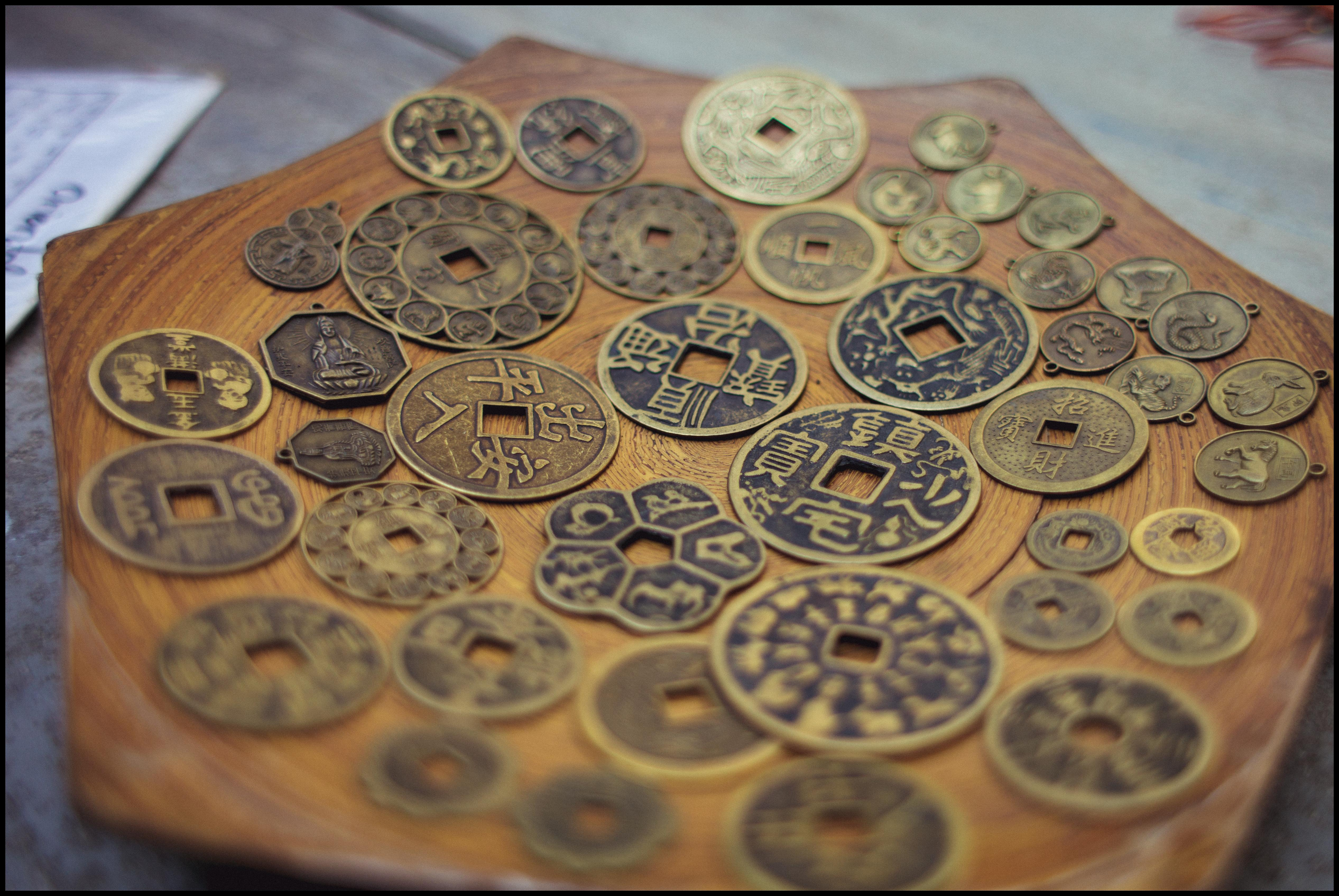
Different types of Yansheng coins in Hội An, Vietnam.

Yansheng coins (traditional Chinese: 厭勝錢; simplified Chinese: 厌胜钱; pinyin: yàn shèng qián), commonly known as Chinese numismatic charms, refer to a collection of special decorative coins that are mainly used for rituals such as fortune telling, Chinese superstitions, and feng shui. They originated during the Western Han dynasty as a variant of the contemporary Ban Liang and Wu Zhu cash coins. Over the centuries, they evolved into their own commodity, with many different shapes and sizes. Their use was revitalized during the Republic of China era. Normally, these coins are privately funded and cast by wealthy families for their own ceremonies, although various governments or religious orders have cast a few types over the centuries. Chinese numismatic charms typically contain hidden symbolism and visual puns. Unlike cash coins, which usually have only two or four Hanzi on one side, Chinese numismatic charms often have more characters and sometimes pictures on the same side.

Although Chinese numismatic charms are not legal tender, they used to circulate on the Chinese market alongside regular government-issued coinage. The charms were considered valuable because they were often made of copper alloys, and Chinese coins were valued by their weight in bronze or brass. In some cases, charms were made from precious metals or jade. In certain periods, some charms were used as alternative currencies. For example, "temple coins" were issued by Buddhist temples during the Yuan dynasty when the copper currency was scarce or when copper production was intentionally limited by the Mongol government.

Yansheng coins are usually heavily decorated with complicated patterns and engravings. Many of them are worn as fashion accessories or good luck charms. The Qing-dynasty-era cash coins have inscriptions of the five emperors Shunzhi, Kangxi, Yongzheng, Qianlong, and Jiaqing, which are said to bring wealth and good fortune to those who string these five coins together.

Chinese numismatic talismans have inspired similar traditions in Japan, Korea, and Vietnam, and often talismans from these other countries can be confused for Chinese charms due to their similar symbolism and inscriptions. Chinese cash coins themselves may be treated as lucky charms outside of China.

== Etymology ==
The formal name for these coins, and the word's pronunciation, was Yasheng coin or money (traditional Chinese: 押胜钱; simplified Chinese: 压胜钱; pinyin: yā shèng qián), but in common modern usage Yansheng is the widely accepted pronunciation and spelling.

Yansheng coins are also known as "flower coins" or "patterned coins" (traditional Chinese: 花錢; simplified Chinese: 花钱; pinyin: huā qián). They are alternatively referred to as "play coins" (wanqian, 玩钱) in China. Historically, the term "Yansheng coins" was more popular, but in modern China and Taiwan the term "flower coins" has become the more common name.

== History and usage ==
Yansheng coins first appeared during the Western Han dynasty as superstitious objects used to communicate with the dead, to pray for favorable outcomes, to terrify ghosts, or to serve as lucky money.

In the Ming and Qing dynasties, the imperial government issued coins for national festivals or ceremonies such as the emperor's birthday. It was common for the emperor's sixtieth birthday to be celebrated by issuing a charm with the inscription Wanshou Tongbao (萬夀通寶), because 60 years symbolizes a complete cycle of the 10 heavenly stems and the 12 earthly branches.

In the case of these coins, "charm" in this context is a catchall term for coin-shaped items which were not official (or counterfeit) money. However, these numismatic objects were not all necessarily considered "magical" or "lucky", as some of these Chinese numismatic charms can be used as "mnemonic coins". The term is further used to identify some gambling tokens that were based on Chinese cash coins or incorporate such designs.

=== Origins ===
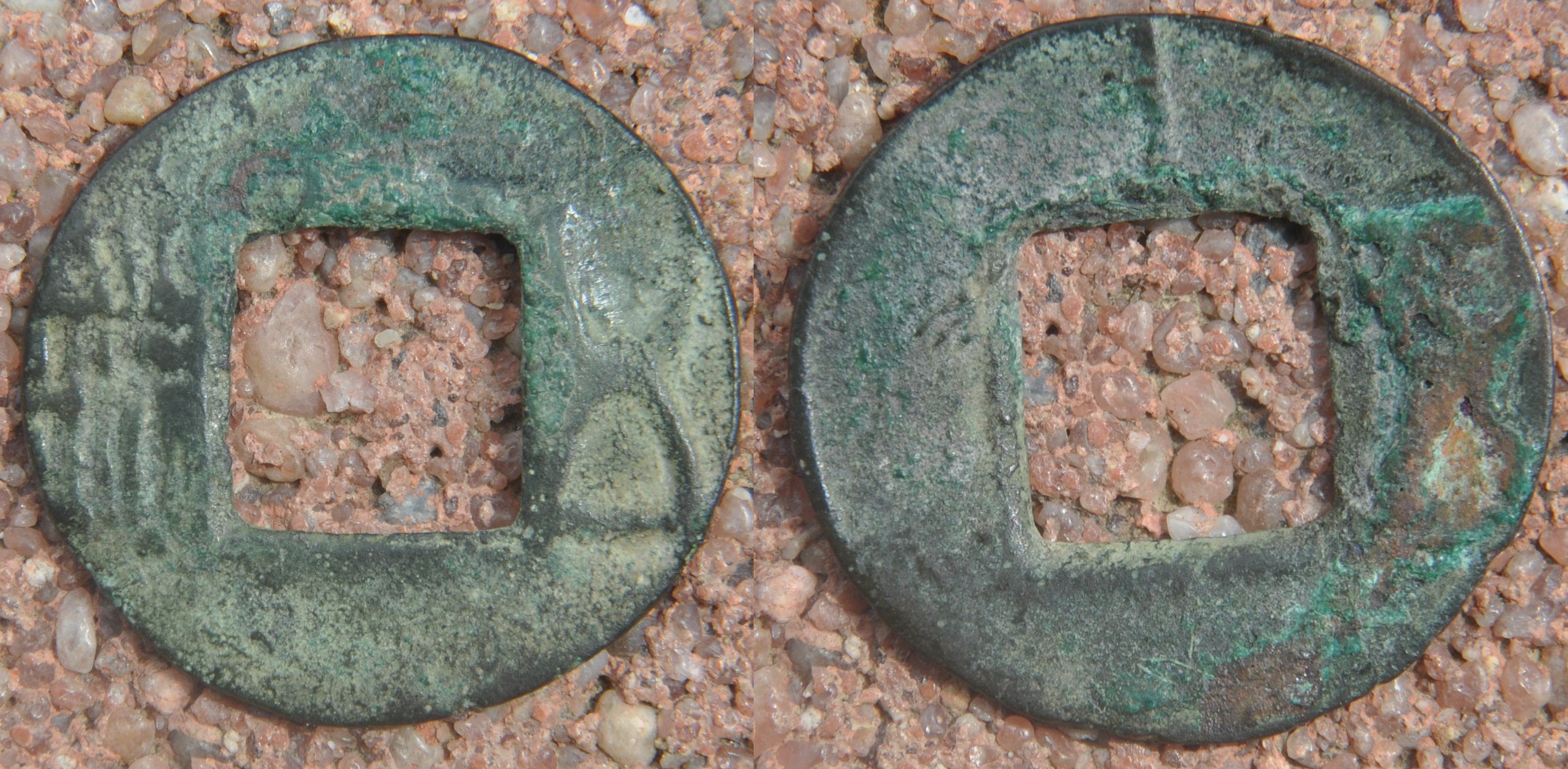
An Eastern Han dynasty Wu Zhu cash coin with additional decorations

The earliest Chinese coinage bore inscriptions that described their place of origin during the Warring States period and sometimes their nominal value. Other forms of notation included circles representing the sun, crescents representing the moon, and dots representing the stars, as well as blobs and lines. These symbols sometimes protruded from the surface of the coin (Chinese: 阳文; Pinyin: yáng wén), and sometimes they were carved, engraved, or stamped (Chinese: 阴文; Pinyin: yīn wén). These symbols would eventually evolve into Chinese charms, with coins originally being used as charms.

Dots were the first and most common symbol on ancient Chinese cash coins, such as the Ban Liang coins, and were most common during the Han dynasty. These symbols were usually on the obverse side of the coins and were probably carved as a part of the mold, meaning that they were intentionally added. Crescent symbols on both the obverse and reverse sides of coins were added around the same period as the dots. After this, both regular Chinese numerals and counting rod numerals began to appear on cash coins during the beginning of the Eastern Han dynasty. Chinese characters began to appear on these early cash coins, which could mean they were intended to circulate in certain regions or might indicate the names of the mints that struck them.

Coins issued under Emperor Wang Mang of the Xin dynasty had a distinctive appearance compared to Han dynasty coinage; they were later used as the basis for many Chinese amulets and charms.

Ancient Chinese texts refer to the Hanzi character for "star" (星) to not exclusively refer to the stars that are visible at night, but also have an additional meaning of "to spread" and "to disseminate" (布, bù). Other old Chinese sources stated that the character for "star" was synonymous with the term for "to give out" and "to distribute" (散, sàn). Based on these associations and the links between coinage and power, it was understood that cash coins should be akin to the star-filled night sky: widespread, numerous, and distributed throughout the world.

Another hypothesis on why star, moon, cloud and dragon symbols appeared on Chinese cash coins is that they represent yin and yang and the wu xing – a fundamental belief of the time – and specifically the element of water (水). The Hanzi character for a "water spring" (泉) also meant "coin" in ancient China. In Chinese mythology, the moon was an envoy or messenger from the heavens, and water was the cold air of yin energy that was accumulated on the moon. The moon was the spirit in charge of water in Chinese mythology, and the crescent symbols on cash coins could indicate that they were meant to circulate like water, which flows, gushes, and rises. The symbolism of "clouds" or "auspicious clouds" may refer to the fact that clouds bring rain; the I Ching mentions that water appears in the heavens as clouds, again implying that cash coins should circulate freely. The appearance of wiggly lines that represent Chinese dragons happened around this time and may have also been based on the wu xing element of water, as dragons were thought to be water animals that were the bringers of both the winds and the rain; the dragons represented the nation, with freely flowing currency. In later Chinese charms, amulets, and talismans, the dragon became a symbol of the Chinese emperor, the central government of China, and its power.

=== Later developments ===
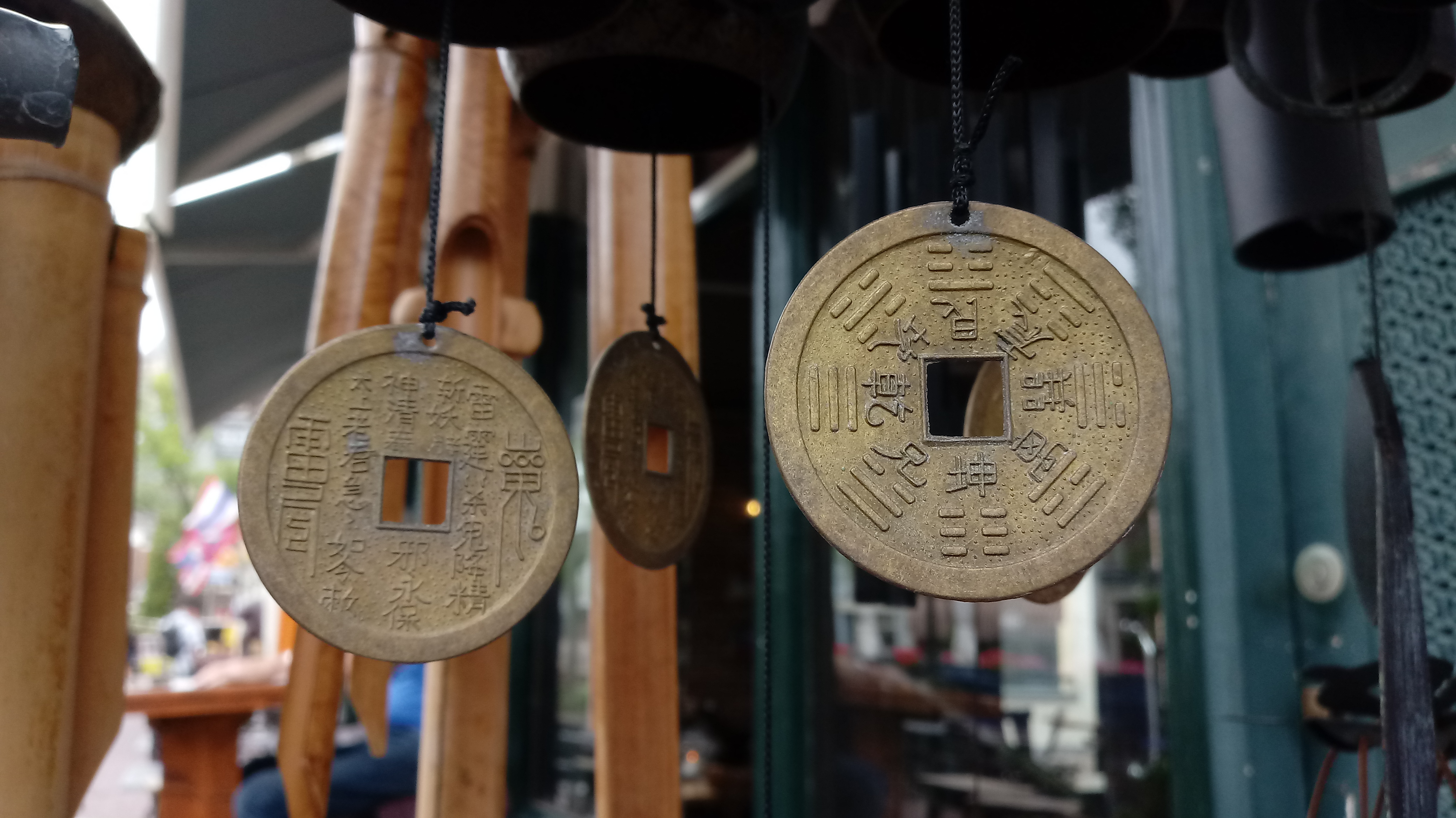
Lei Ting curse charms in Delft, the Netherlands; these amulets are shaped like ordinary cash coins but contain examples of Taoist symbolism and imagery.

Most Chinese numismatic charms produced from the start of the Han dynasty until the end of the Northern and Southern dynasties (206 BCE – 589 CE) were very similar in appearance to the Chinese cash coins that were in circulation. The only differentiating factor that Chinese talismans had at the time was the symbols on the reverse of these coins. These symbols included tortoises, snakes, double-edged swords, the sun, the moon, stars, depictions of famous people, and the twelve Chinese zodiacs. The major development and evolution of Chinese numismatic talismans occurred from the Six Dynasties through the Mongol Yuan dynasty. It was during this era that Chinese numismatic charms began to feature inscriptions wishing for "longevity" and "happiness", and these charms and amulets became extremely common in Chinese society. Taoist and Buddhist amulets also began to appear during this period, as did marriage coin charms with "Kama Sutra-like" imagery. Chinese numismatic charms also began to be made from iron, lead, tin, silver, gold, porcelain, jade, and paper. These charms also featured new scripts and fonts such as regular script, grass script, seal script, and Fulu (Taoist "magic writing" script). The association of Chinese characters into new and mystical forms added hidden symbolism.

Charms with inscriptions such as fú dé cháng shòu (福德長壽) and qiān qiū wàn suì (千秋萬歲, 1,000 autumns, 10,000 years) were first cast around the end of the Northern dynasties period and continued through the Khitan Liao, Jurchen Jin, and Mongol Yuan dynasties. During the Tang and Song dynasties, open-work charms began to include images of Chinese dragons, qilin, flowers and other plants, fish, deer, insects, Chinese phoenixes, and people. The open-work charms from this era were used as clothing accessories, adornment, or to decorate horses. The very common charm inscription cháng mìng fù guì (長命富貴) was introduced during the Tang and Song dynasties, when the reverse side of these talismans began to feature Taoist imagery, such as yin-yang symbols, the eight trigrams, and the Chinese zodiac. During the Song dynasty, a large number of Chinese talismans were cast, especially horse coins, which were used as gambling tokens and board game pieces. Fish charms meant to be worn around the waist were introduced during the reign of the Khitan Liao. Other new types emerged during the Jurchen Jin dynasty, influenced by steppe culture and the arts of the Jurchen people. The Jin dynasty merged Jurchen culture with Chinese administration, and the charms of the Jin dynasty innovated on the talismans of the Song dynasty, which used hidden symbolism, allusions, implied suggestions, and phonetic homonyms to convey meaning. Under the Jurchens, new symbols emerged: a dragon representing the emperor, a phoenix representing the empress, tigers representing ministers, lions representing the government as a whole, and cranes and pine trees symbolizing longevity. Hidden symbolism, such as jujube fruits for "morning or early" and chickens symbolizing "being lucky", also emerged under the Jurchens.

Under the Ming and Manchu Qing dynasties, there was an increased manufacture of amulets with inscriptions that wished for good luck and celebrated events. These numismatic talismans depict what is called the "three many": happiness, longevity, and having many progeny. Other common wishes included those for wealth and for attaining a high rank in the imperial examination system. During this period, more Chinese numismatic talismans began to use implied and hidden meanings through visual puns. This practice was particularly expanded upon during the Manchu Qing dynasty.

== Styles ==
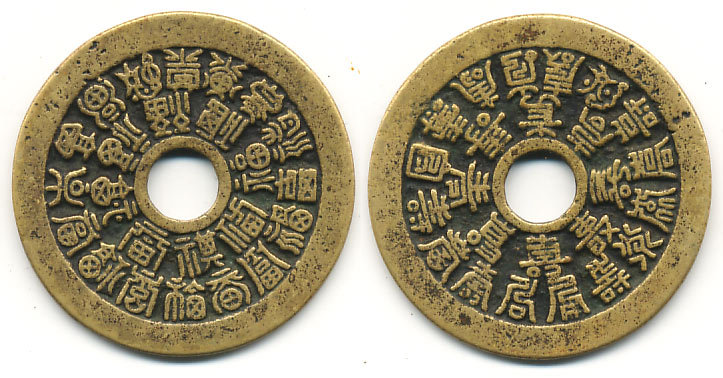
A Yansheng coin of Chinese characters 福 (left) and 壽 (right) repeated in various scripts. Qing dynasty antique

Unlike government-issued Chinese cash coins, which typically have only four characters, Chinese numismatic charms often have more characters and may depict various scenes. They can come in several different styles:

- carved or engraved (Chinese: 镂空品; pinyin: lòukōng pǐn)
  - with animal
  - with people
  - with plants
- words or characters on coin (Chinese: 钱文品; pinyin: qián wén pǐn)
- sentences or wishes (Chinese: 吉语品; pinyin: jí yǔ pǐn)
- Chinese zodiac (Chinese: 生肖品; pinyin: shēngxiào pǐn)
- Taoism, Bagua (Chinese: 八卦品; pinyin: bāguà pǐn), or Buddhism gods (Chinese: 神仙佛道品; pinyin: shénxiān fó dào pǐn)
- Horses or military themes (Chinese: 打马格品; pinyin: dǎ mǎ gé pǐn)
- Abnormal or combined styles (Chinese: 异形品; pinyin: yìxíng pǐn)

Early Chinese numismatic charms were typically cast until machine-struck coinage appeared in China during the 19th century.

A large number of Chinese numismatic charms have been cast over a period more than 2000 years, these charms have evolved with the changing culture as time passed which is reflected in their themes and inscriptions. In his 2020 work Cast Chinese Amulets British numismatist and author David Hartill had documented over 5000 different types of Chinese numismatic charms. Traditionally, catalogues of these amulets are arranged in various ways, such as by shape, size, the meaning of the charms, the Emperor's name, or any other common feature. While other catalogues deliberately avoid such categorizations as it would not be immediately clear to a novice (non-expert) whether an individual Chinese amulet would be considered to be a "Lucky", "Religious", "Family", or "Coin" type charm.

== Types of Chinese charms ==
=== By function ===
==== Good luck charms ====
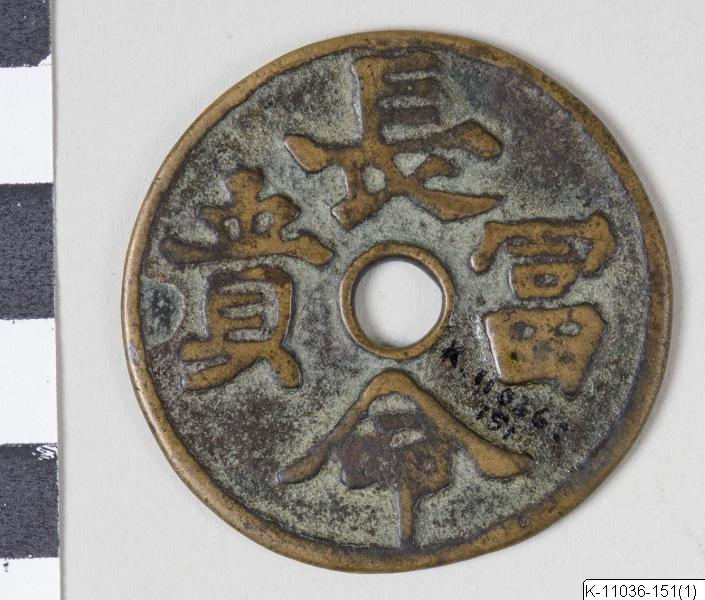
Chinese "good luck" coins often contain inscriptions wishing for auspicious outcomes.

Chinese numismatic "good luck charms" or "auspicious charms" are inscribed with various Chinese characters representing good luck and prosperity. There was a popular belief in their strong effect, and they were traditionally used to scare away evil and protect families. They generally contain either four or eight characters wishing for good luck, good fortune, money, a long life, many children, and good results in the Imperial examination system. Some of these charms used images or visual puns to make a statement wishing for prosperity and success. Some feature pomegranates, which symbolise the desire for successful, skilled male children to strengthen the family and continue its lineage.

Another common theme in Chinese numismatic charms is a rhinoceros. Its depiction is associated with happiness because the Chinese words for "rhinoceros" and "happiness" are both pronounced xi. The rhinoceros became extinct in Southern China during the ancient period, and the animal became enshrined in myth, with legends that the stars in the sky were reflected in the veins and patterns of a rhinoceros' horn. The horn of the rhinoceros was believed to emit a vapour that could penetrate bodies of water, traverse the skies, and open channels for direct communication with the spirits.

Some good luck charms contain inscriptions such as téng jiāo qǐ fèng (騰蛟起鳳, "a dragon soaring and a phoenix dancing" which is a reference to a story of Wang Bo), lián shēng guì zǐ (連生貴子, "May there be the birth of one honorable son after another"), and zhī lán yù shù (芝蘭玉樹, "A Talented and Noble Young Man").

==== Safe journey charms ====
Safe journey charms are a major category of Chinese numismatic charms, which were produced out of a concern for personal safety while traveling. One side would usually have an inscription wishing the holder of the charm a safe journey, while the other would feature common talisman themes such as the Bagua, weapons, and stars. It is believed that the Boxers used safe journey charms as badges of membership during their rebellion against the Manchu Qing dynasty.

==== Peace charms ====
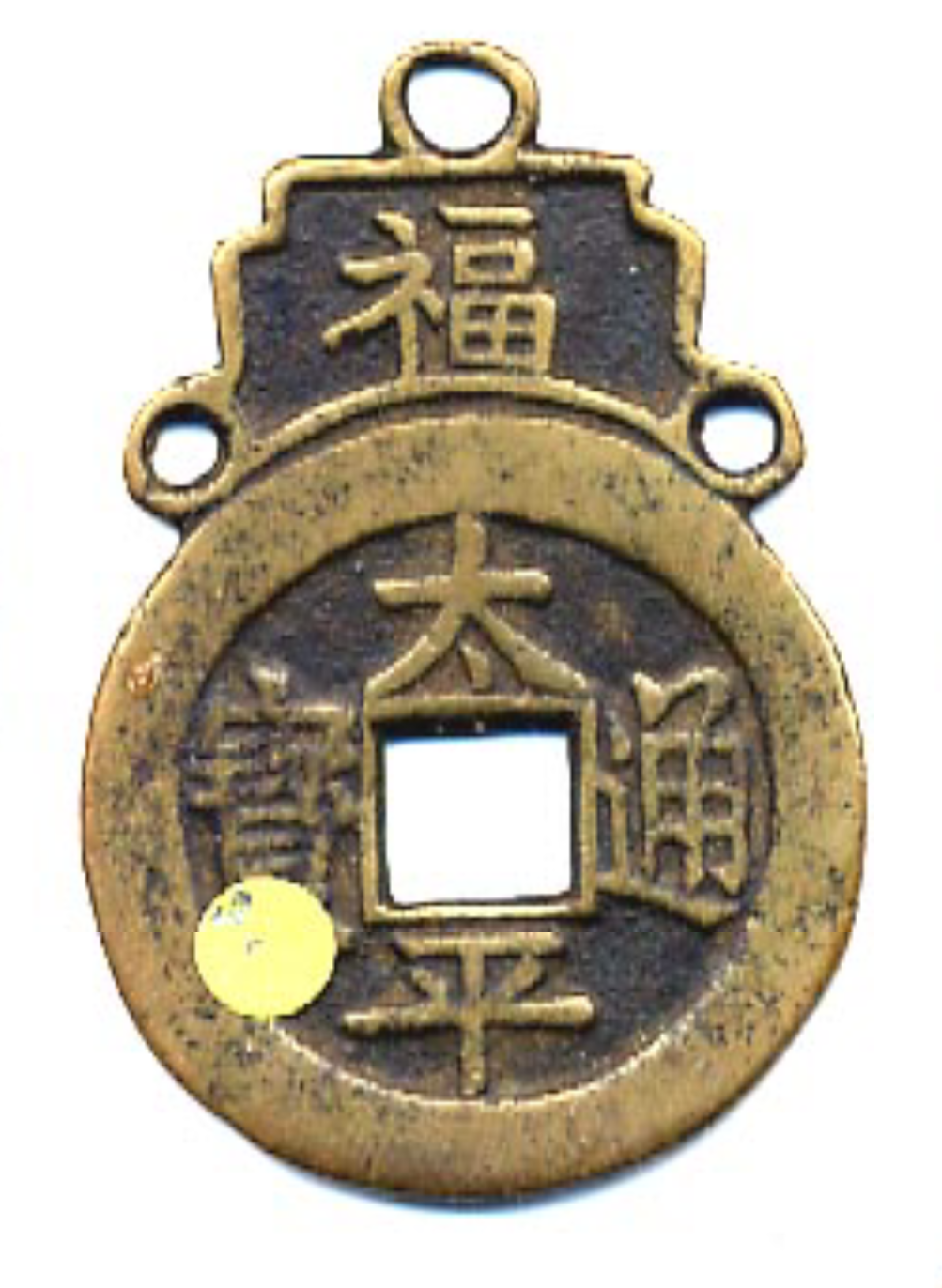
A gourd-shaped Chinese numismatic peace charm

Peace charms (Traditional Chinese: 天下太平錢; Simplified Chinese: 天下太平钱; Pinyin: tiān xià tài píng qián) have inscriptions wishing for peace and prosperity and are based on Chinese coins that use the characters 太平 (tài píng). These coins are often considered to have charm-like powers.

An archeological find of the 1980s established that they were first cast by the Kingdom of Shu after the collapse of the Han dynasty. This coin bore the inscription tài píng bǎi qián (太平百錢), was worth one hundred Chinese cash coins, and bore a calligraphic style which resembled charms more than contemporary coinage. During the Song dynasty, Emperor Taizong issued a coin with the inscription tài píng tōng bǎo (太平通寶), and under the reign of the Chongzhen Emperor appeared a Ming dynasty coin with the inscription tài píng (太平) on the reverse and chóng zhēn tōng bǎo (崇禎通寶) on the obverse. During the Taiping Rebellion, the Taiping Heavenly Kingdom issued coins ("holy coins") with the inscription tài píng tiān guó (太平天囯).

Peace charms, privately cast with the wish for peace, were used daily throughout China's turbulent, often violent history. Under the Qing dynasty, Chinese charms with the inscription tiān xià tài píng (天下太平) became a common sight. This phrase could be translated as "peace under heaven", "peace and tranquility under heaven", or "an empire at peace". Peace charms also depict the twelve Chinese zodiac signs and contain visual puns.

During the Qing dynasty, a tài píng tōng bǎo (太平通寶) (Note: This was an official inscription on a government-cast cash coin during the Northern Song dynasty.) peace charm was created that had additional characters and symbolism at the rim of the coin: on the left and right sides of the charm the characters 吉 and 祥, which can be translated as "good fortune", while on the reverse side the characters rú yì (如意, "as you wish") is located at the top and bottom of the rim. When these four characters are combined, they read rú yì jí xiáng which is translated as "good fortune according to your wishes", a popular expression in China. This charm is a very rare design due to its double rim (重輪), which features a thin circular rim surrounding the broad outer rim. This specific charm has an additional inscription in the recessed area of the rim; an example of a contemporary Chinese cash coin which had these features would be a 100 cash xianfeng zhongbao (咸豐重寶) coin. On the reverse side of this Manchu Qing dynasty era charm are a multitude of inscriptions that have auspicious meanings such as qū xié qiǎn shà (驅邪遣煞, "expel and strike dead evil influences"), tassels and swords which represent a symbolic victory of good over evil, two bats which is a visual pun as the Chinese word for bat is similar to the Chinese word for happiness, and the additional inscription of dāng wàn (當卍, "Value Ten Thousand", the supposed symbolic denomination).

==== Burial coins ====
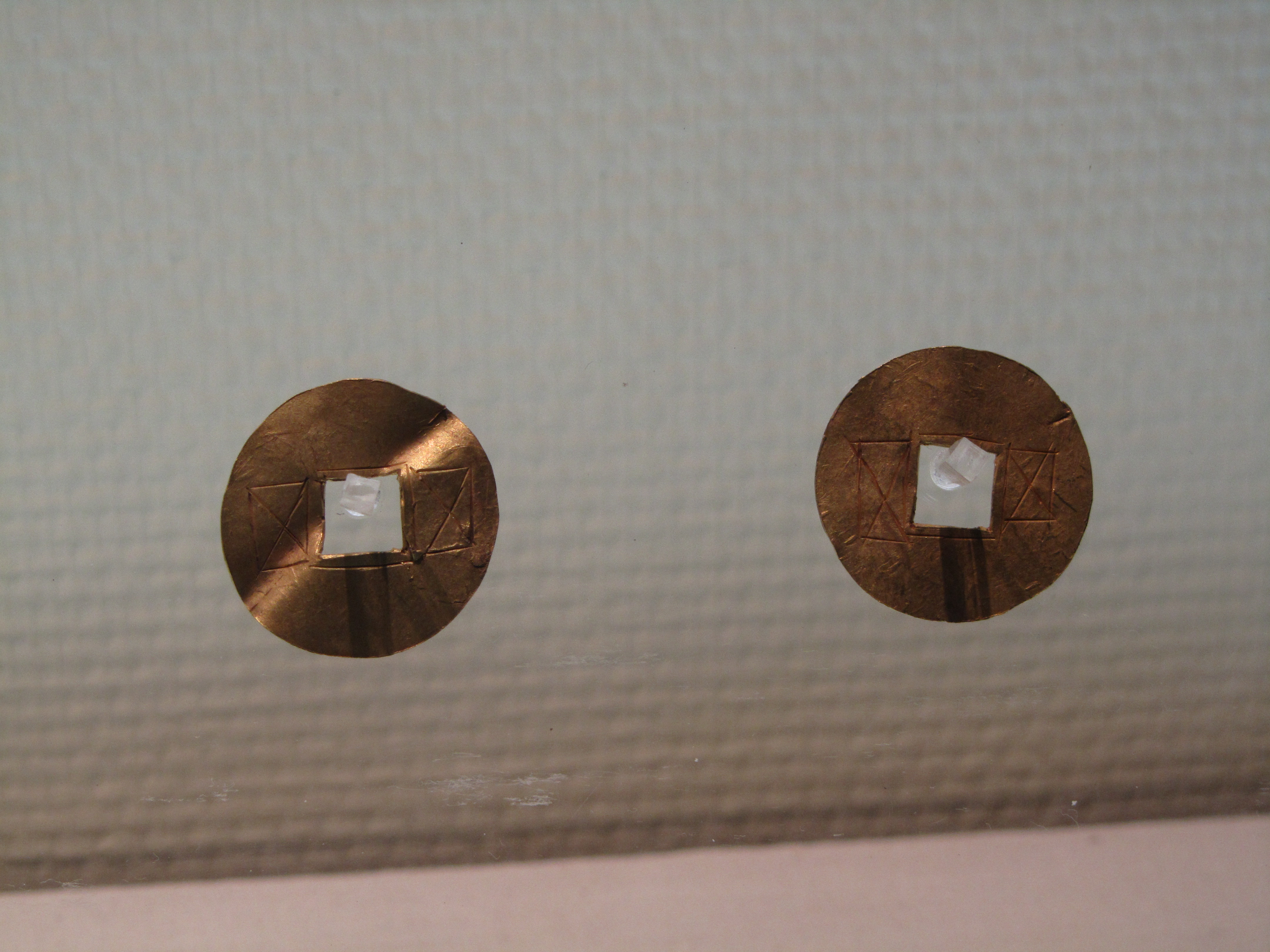
Chinese burial coins made of gold during the Jin dynasty.

Chinese burial coins (Traditional Chinese: 瘞錢; Simplified Chinese: 瘗钱; Pinyin: yì qián) a.k.a. dark coins (Traditional Chinese: 冥錢; Simplified Chinese: 冥钱; Pinyin: míng qián) are Chinese imitations of currency that are placed in the grave of a person who is to be buried. The practice dates to the Shang dynasty when cowrie shells were used, in the belief that the money would be used in the afterlife as a bribe to Yan Wang (also known as Yama) for a more favourable spiritual destination. The practice changed to replica currency to deter grave robbers, and these coins and other imitation currencies were referred to as clay money (泥錢) or earthenware money (陶土幣). Chinese graves have been found with clay versions of what the Chinese refer to as "low currency" (下幣), such as cowrie shells, Ban Liang, Wu Zhu, Daquan Wuzhu, Tang dynasty Kaiyuan Tongbao, Song dynasty Chong Ni Zhong Bao, Liao dynasty Tian Chao Wan Shun, Bao Ning Tong Bao, Da Kang Tong Bao, Jurchen Jin dynasty Da Ding Tong Bao, and Qing dynasty Qian Long Tong Bao cash coins. Graves from various periods have also been found with imitations of gold and silver "high currency" (上幣), such as Kingdom of Chu's gold plate money (泥｢郢稱｣(楚國黃金貨)), yuan jin (爰金), silk funerary money (絲織品做的冥幣), gold pie money (陶質"金餅"), and other cake-shaped objects (冥器). In modern use, Joss paper replaces clay replicas and is burned rather than buried with the deceased.

===== "Laid to Rest" burial charms =====
Chinese "Laid to Rest" burial charms are bronze funerary charms or coins usually found in graves. They measure from 2.4 to 2.45 centimetres (0.94 to 0.96 in) in diameter with a thickness of 1.3 to 1.4 millimetres (0.051 to 0.055 in), and they contain the obverse inscription rù tǔ wéi ān (入土为安), which means "to be laid to rest", while the reverse is blank. These coins were mostly found in graves dating to the late Qing dynasty, though one was found in a hoard of Northern Song dynasty coins. The wéi is written using a simplified Chinese character (为) rather than the traditional Chinese version of the character (為). These coins are often excluded from numismatic reference books on Chinese coinage or talismans due to numerous taboos, as they were placed in the mouths of the dead and are considered unlucky and disturbing, and are undesirable to most collectors.

==== Marriage and sex education charms ====
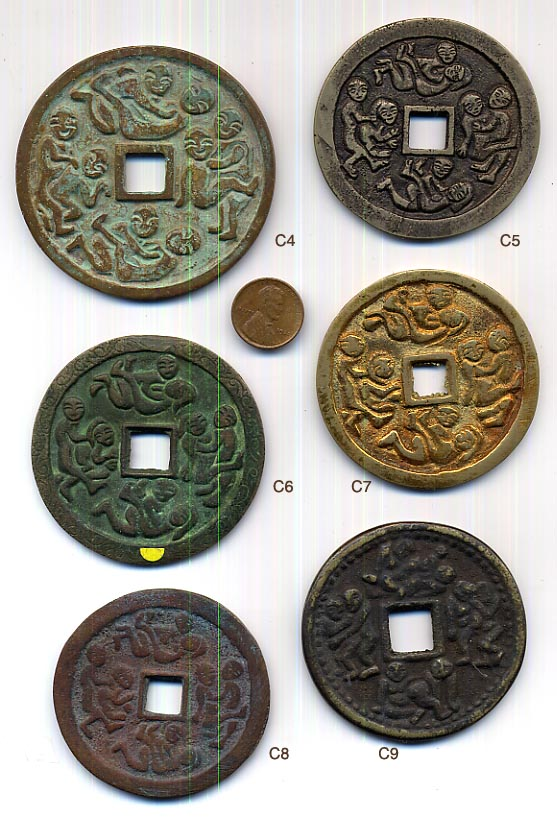
A group of Chinese sex education coins, each showing four different sexual positions.

Chinese marriage charms (Traditional Chinese: 夫婦和合花錢; Simplified Chinese: 夫妇和合花钱; Pinyin: fū fù hé hé huā qián) are Chinese numismatic charms or amulets that depict scenes of sexual intercourse in various positions. They are known by many other names, including secret play coins (Traditional Chinese: 秘戲錢; Simplified Chinese: 秘戏钱; Pinyin: mì xì qián), secret fun coins, hide (evade) the fire (of lust) coins (Traditional Chinese: 避火錢; Simplified Chinese: 避火钱; Pinyin: bì huǒ qián), Chinese marriage coins, Chinese love coins, Chinese spring money (Traditional Chinese: 春錢; Simplified Chinese: 春钱; Pinyin: chūn qián), Chinese erotic coins, and Chinese wedding coins. They illustrate how the newlywed couple should behave on their wedding night to fulfill their responsibilities and obligations to have children. They may depict dates and peanuts symbolising the wish for reproduction, lotus seeds symbolising "continuous births", chestnuts symbolising male offspring, pomegranates symbolising fertility, brans symbolising sons that will be successful, "dragon and phoenix" candles, cypress leaves, qilins, bronze mirrors, shoes, saddles, and other things associated with traditional Chinese weddings.

The name "spring money" refers to an ancient Chinese ritual in which girls and boys would sing romantic songs to each other from across a stream. Sex acts were traditionally only scarcely depicted in Chinese art, but stone carvings from the Han dynasty showcasing sexual intercourse were found, and bronze mirrors with various sexual themes were common during the Tang dynasty. It was also during the Tang dynasty that coins depicting sex began to be produced. Chinese love charms often bear the inscription "wind, flowers, snow and moon" (風花雪月), an obscure verse evoking a happy, frivolous setting. However, every individual character might also be used to identify a Chinese goddess or the "Seven Fairy Maidens" (七仙女). Other Chinese wedding charms often have inscriptions like fēng huā yí rén (風花宜人), míng huáng yù yǐng (明皇禦影), and lóng fèng chéng yàng (龍鳳呈樣). These charms could also be used in brothels where a traveller could use the illustrations to request a prostitute without knowing the local language.

Some Chinese marriage charms contain references to the well-known 9th-century poem Chang hen ge, with figures illustrated in four different sexual positions and four Chinese characters representing spring, wind, peaches, and plums.

A design for Chinese, Korean, and Vietnamese marriage amulets features a pair of fish on one side and the inscription Eo ssang (魚双, "Pair of Fish") on the other. In various Oriental cultures fish are associated with plenty and abundance. Fish are furthermore noted for their prolific ability to reproduce and that when they swim that this was in joy and are therefore associated with a happy and harmonious marriage. In Feng Shui, a pair of fish are associated with conjugal bliss and the joys of being in a matrimonial union.

==== House charms ====
Chinese house charms refer to Chinese numismatic talismans placed within a house to bring good fortune to the place, or to balance the house according to Feng shui. These charms date to the Han dynasty and were placed in houses even while the building was under construction; they were also placed in temples and other buildings. Many traditional Chinese houses tend to display images of the menshen (threshold guardian). Some buildings were built with a "foundation stone" (石敢當), based on the Mount Tai in Shandong, with the inscription tài shān zài cǐ (泰山在此, "Mount Tai is here") or tài shān shí gǎn dāng (泰山石敢當, "the stone of Mount Tai dares to resist"). Ridgepoles in Chinese buildings are usually painted red and are decorated with red paper, cloth banners, and Bagua charms. Five poison charms are often used to deter unwanted human visitors and animal pests. Many Chinese house charms are small bronze statues of bearded old men assigned to protect the house from evil spirits, the God of War, Zhong Kui (鍾馗), and the "Polar Deity". House charms tend to have inscriptions inviting good fortune into the home like cháng mìng fù guì (長命富貴, "longevity, wealth and honour"), fú shòu tóng tiān (福壽同天, "good fortune and longevity on the same day"), zhāo cái jìn bǎo (招財進寶, "attracts wealth and treasure"), sì jì píng ān (四季平安, "peace for the four seasons"), wǔ fú pěng shòu (五福捧壽, "five fortunes surround longevity"), shàng tiān yán hǎo shì (上天言好事, "ascend to heaven and speak of good deeds"), and huí gōng jiàng jí xiáng (回宮降吉祥, "return to your palace and bring good fortune").

==== Palace cash coins ====
Palace cash coins are sometimes included as a category of Chinese numismatic charms. These special coins, according to the Standard Catalog of World Coins by Krause Publications, were specifically produced to be presented as gifts during Chinese new year to the people who worked in the Chinese imperial palace such as imperial guards and eunuchs, who would hang these special coins below lamps. In his book Qing Cash, published by the Royal Numismatic Society in the year 2003, David Hartill noted that these palace cash coins were only produced during the establishment of a new reign era title. The first Chinese palace cash coins were produced in the year 1736 during the reign of the Qianlong Emperor and tend to be between 30 millimeters and 40 millimeters in diameter. These palace cash coins were produced until the end of the Qing dynasty.

These coins contain the reign titles Qianlong, Jiaqing, Daoguang, Xianfeng, Tongzhi, Guangxu, or Xuantong with "Tongbao" (通寶), or rarely "Zhongbao" (重寶), in their obverse inscription and the reverse inscription "Tianxia Taiping" (天下太平). These special cash coins were wrapped inside of a piece of rectangular cloth and every time that an Emperor died (or "ascended to his ancestors") the coins were replaced with new reign titles. Some Tianxia Taiping cash coins were manufactured by the Ministry of Revenue while private mints produced others. Palace issues tend to be larger than circulation cash coins with the same inscriptions.

=== By shape and design ===
Most Chinese numismatic charms imitated round coins with a square hole that were in circulation when the charms first appeared. As the charms evolved separately from government-minted coinage, coins shaped like spades, locks, fish, peaches, and gourds emerged. though most retained the appearance of contemporary Chinese coinage.

==== Gourd charms ====
Gourd charms (Traditional Chinese: 葫蘆錢; Simplified Chinese: 葫芦钱; Pinyin: hú lu qián) are shaped like calabashes (bottle gourds). These charms are used to wish for good health, as the calabash is associated with traditional Chinese medicine, or for many sons, as trailing calabash vines are associated with men and carry myriad seeds. As the first character in the gourd is pronounced as hú (葫), which sounds similar to hù, the pronunciation of the Chinese word for "protect" (護) or for "blessing" (祜), gourd charms are also used to ward off evil spirits. Calabashes were believed to have the magical power of protecting children from smallpox, and gourd charms were believed to keep children healthy. Calabashes are also shaped like the Arabic numeral "8", which is a lucky number in China. A variant of the gourd charm is shaped like two stacked cash coins, with a smaller one on top, resembling a calabash. These charms have four characters and auspicious messages.

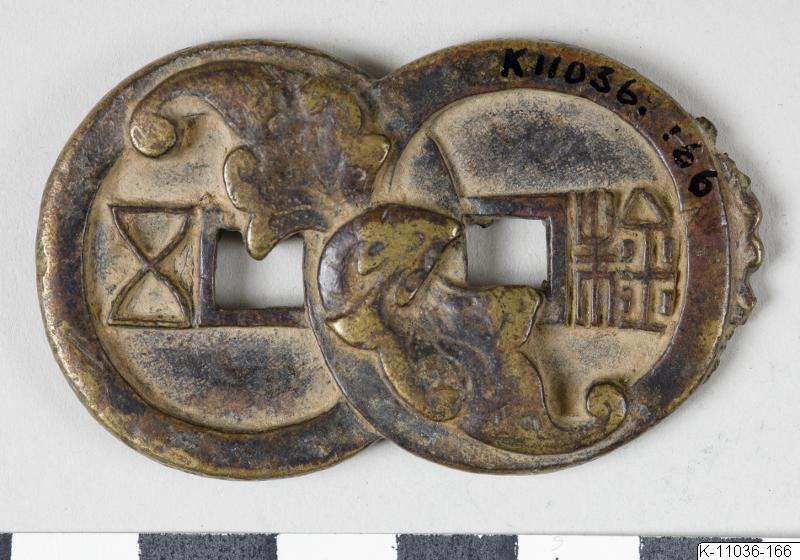
A visual pun using a bat and the "eyes" of two Wu Zhu cash coins.

The gourd charm pictured to the right, which is composed of two replicas of Wu Zhu cash coins with a bat placed to obscure the character at their intersection, forms a visual pun. The Chinese word for "bat" sounds similar to that of "happiness", the square hole in the center of a cash coin is referred to as an "eye" (眼, yǎn), and the Chinese word for "coin" (錢, qián) has almost the same pronunciation as "before" (前, qián). This combination can be interpreted as "happiness is before your eyes".

==== Vault protector coins ====
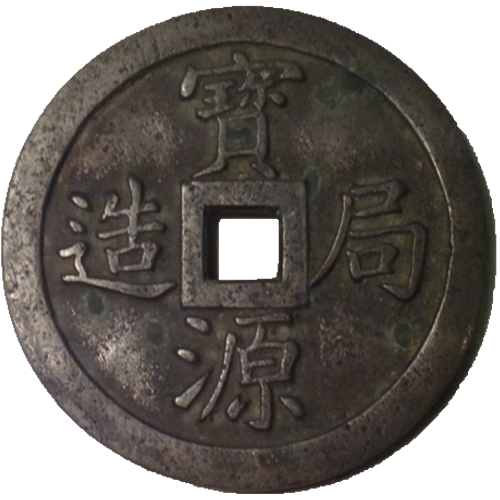
A Vault Protector coin made by the Board of Public Works Mint in Beijing.

Vault protector coins (Traditional Chinese: 鎮庫錢; Simplified Chinese: 镇库钱; Pinyin: zhèn kù qián) were a type of coin created by Chinese mints. These coins were significantly larger, heavier, and thicker than regular cash coins, and were well-made, as they were designed to occupy a special place within the mint's treasury. The treasury had a spirit hall for offerings to the gods of the Chinese pantheon, and Vault Protector coins would be hung with red silk and tassels for the Chinese God of Wealth. These coins were believed to possess charm-like magical powers that would protect the vault and bring wealth and fortune to the treasury.

Vault protector coins were produced for over a thousand years, starting in the Southern Tang during the Five Dynasties and Ten Kingdoms period and continuing until the Qing dynasty. Vault protector coins were typically cast to commemorate the opening of new furnaces for casting cash coins.

==== Open-work charms ====
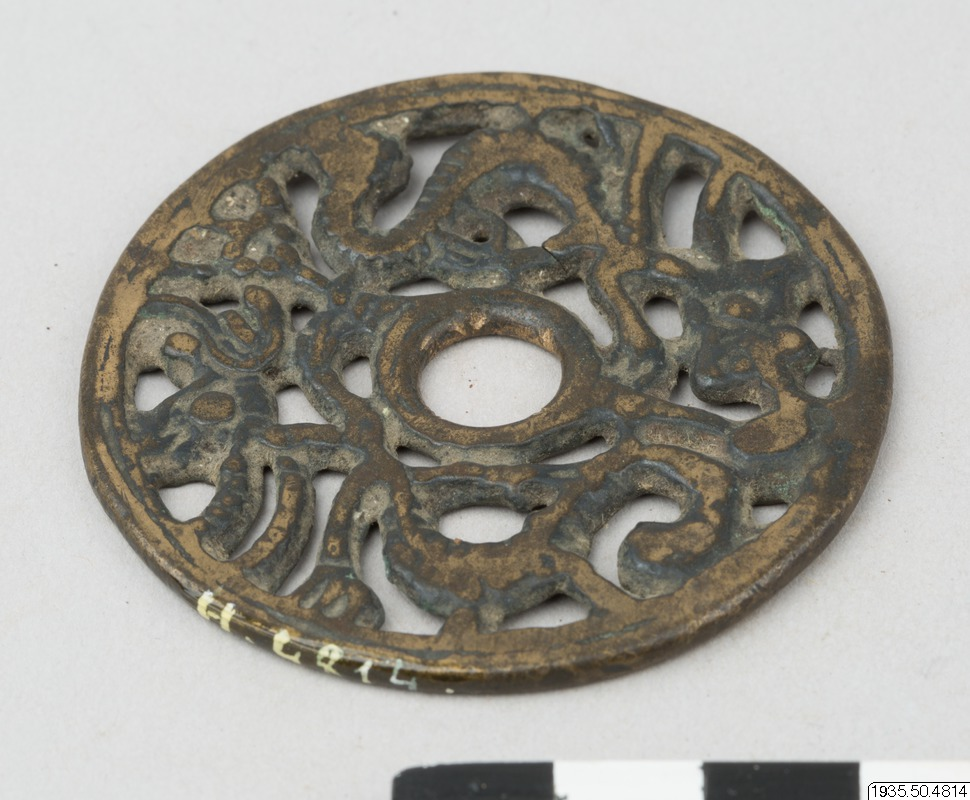
An Open-work charm on display at the Museum of Ethnography, Sweden.

Open-work money (Traditional Chinese: 鏤空錢; Simplified Chinese: 镂空钱; Pinyin: lòu kōng qián) also known as "elegant" money (Traditional Chinese: 玲瓏錢; Simplified Chinese: 玲珑钱; Pinyin: líng lóng qián) are types of Chinese numismatic charms characterised by irregularly shaped openings or holes between the other design elements. Most open-work charms have mirrored designs on the reverse side, with Chinese characters rarely appearing. They tend to have a single large round hole in the middle of the coin, or a square hole for those that feature building designs. Compared to other Chinese charms, open-work charms are significantly larger and more often made from bronze than brass. They first appeared during the Han dynasty, though most of these are small specimens taken from various utensils. They became more popular during the reigns of the Song, Mongol Yuan, and Ming dynasties but lost popularity under the Manchu Qing dynasty.

Categories of open-work charms:

Category	Image
Open-work charms with immortals and people	
Dragon open-work charms	
Phoenix open-work charms	
Peacock open-work charms	
Qilin open-work charms	
Bat open-work charms	
Lotus open-work charms	
Flower and Vine open-work charms	
Open-work charms with buildings and temples (Note: Most of the open-work charms depicting buildings and temples are believed to have been cast in the city of Dali, Yunnan during the Ming dynasty.)	
Fish open-work charms	
Deer open-work charms	
Lion open-work charms	
Tiger open-work charms	
Rabbit open-work charms	
Bird open-work charms	
Crane open-work charms	
Horse open-work charms	

==== 24 character charms ====
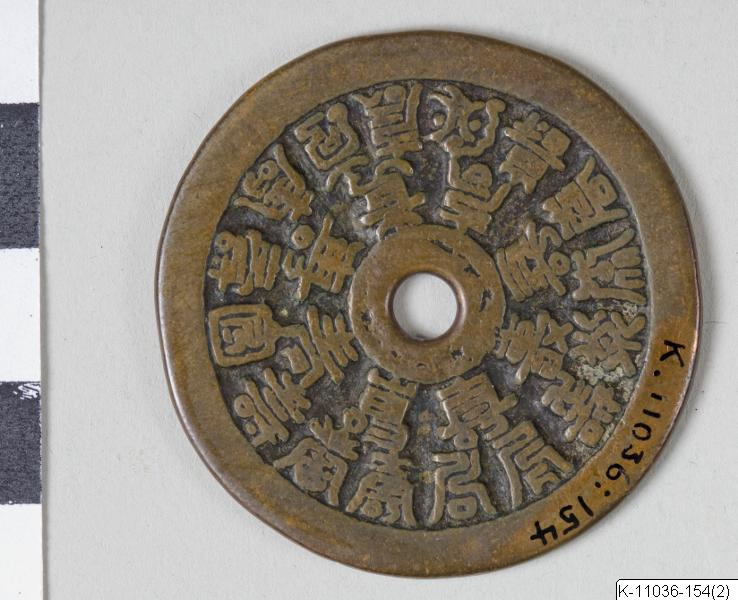
A 24 character charm on display at the Museum of Ethnography, Sweden.

24 character "Good Fortune" charms (Traditional Chinese: 二十四福字錢; Simplified Chinese: 二十四福字钱; Pinyin: èr shí sì fú zì qián) and 24 character longevity charms (Traditional Chinese: 二十四壽字錢; Simplified Chinese: 二十四寿字钱; Pinyin: èr shí sì shòu zì qián) refer to Chinese numismatic charms which have a pattern of twenty-four characters on one side which contains a variation of either the Hanzi character fú (福, good luck) or shòu (壽, longevity), the two most-common Hanzi characters to appear on Chinese charms. The ancient Chinese believed that the more characters a charm had, the more good fortune it would bring, although it is not known why 24 characters is the default used for these charms. One proposition claims that 24 was selected because it is a multiple of 8, which the ancient Chinese considered auspicious due to its similar pronunciation to the word for "good luck". It may also represent the sum of the twelve Chinese zodiacs and the twelve earthly branches. Other possibilities include the 24 directions of the Chinese feng shui compass (罗盘), that Chinese years are divided into 12 months and 12 shichen, that the Chinese season markers are divided into 24 solar terms, or the 24 examples of filial piety from Confucianism.

==== Chinese Spade charms ====
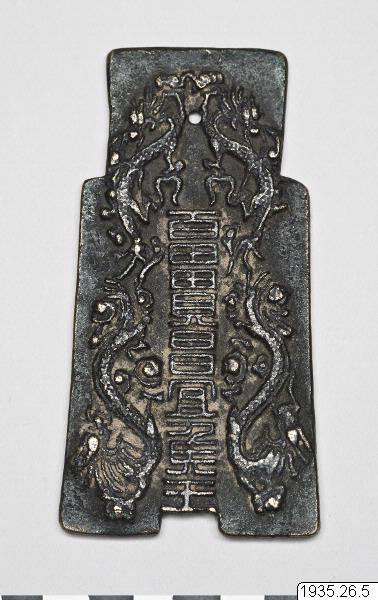
A Chinese spade charm on display at the Museum of Ethnography, Sweden.

Spade charms are charms based on spade money, an early form of Chinese coin. Spade charms are based on Spade money, which circulated during the Zhou dynasty until they were abolished by the Qin dynasty. Spade money was briefly reintroduced by Wang Mang during the Xin dynasty, and Chinese spade charms are generally based on this coinage.

==== Chinese lock charms ====
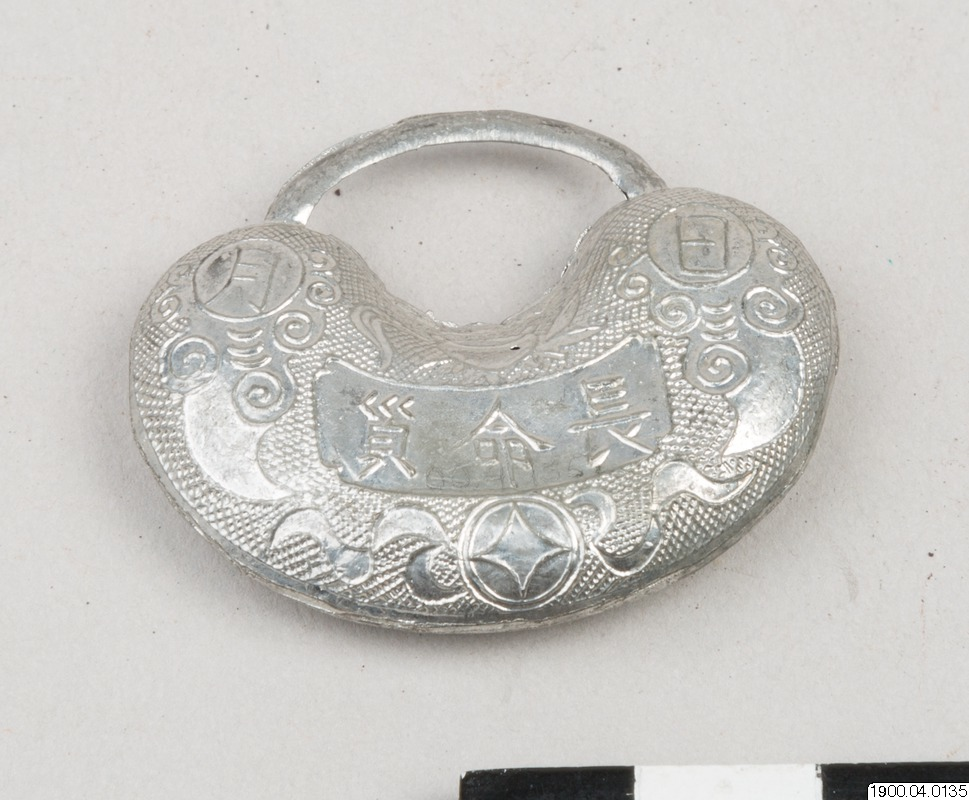
A silver Chinese lock charm on display at the Museum of Ethnography, Sweden.

Chinese lock charms (Traditional Chinese: 家鎖; Simplified Chinese: 家锁; Pinyin: jiā suǒ) are based on locks, and symbolize protection from evil spirits of both the holder and their property. They were also thought to bring good fortune, longevity, and high results in the imperial exams, and were often tied around children's necks by Buddhist or Taoist priests. Chinese lock charms are flat and have no moving parts, and their shape resembles the Hanzi character "凹", which means "concave". All Chinese lock charms feature Chinese characters. An example of a Chinese lock charm is the "hundred family lock" (Traditional Chinese: 百家鎖), traditionally funded by a low-income family asking a hundred other families to each gift a cash coin as a gesture of goodwill for their newborn child, vesting an interest in the child's security. Many Chinese lock charms are used to wish for stability. Other designs of lock charms include religious mountains, the Bagua, and the Yin Yang symbol.

==== Nine-Fold Seal Script charms ====
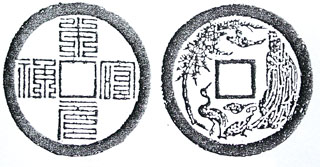
A Nine-Fold Seal Script charms with the inscription Benming Yuanshen (本命元神).

Nine-Fold Seal Script charms (Traditional Chinese: 九疊文錢; Simplified Chinese: 九叠文钱; Pinyin: jiǔ dié wén qián) are Chinese numismatic charms with inscriptions in nine-fold seal script, a style of seal script that was in use from the Song dynasty until the Qing dynasty. Examples from the Song dynasty are rare. Around the end of the Ming dynasty, there were Nine-Fold Seal Script charms cast with the inscription fú shòu kāng níng (福壽康寧, "happiness, longevity, health and composure"), and bǎi fú bǎi shòu (百福百壽, "one hundred happinesses and one hundred longevities") on the reverse side.

==== Fish charms ====
Fish charms (Traditional Chinese: 魚形飾仵; Simplified Chinese: 鱼形饰仵; Pinyin: yú xíng shì wǔ) are shaped like fish. The Chinese character for "fish" (魚, yú) is pronounced the same as that for "surplus" (余, yú), so the symbol for fish has traditionally been associated with good luck, fortune, longevity, fertility, and other auspicious things. As the Chinese character for "profit" (利, lì) is pronounced similar to "carp" (鯉, lǐ), carps are most commonly used for the motif of fish charms. Fish charms were often used on the belief that they would protect children's health, and featured inscriptions wishing the children who carried them to stay alive and safe.

==== Chinese peach charms ====
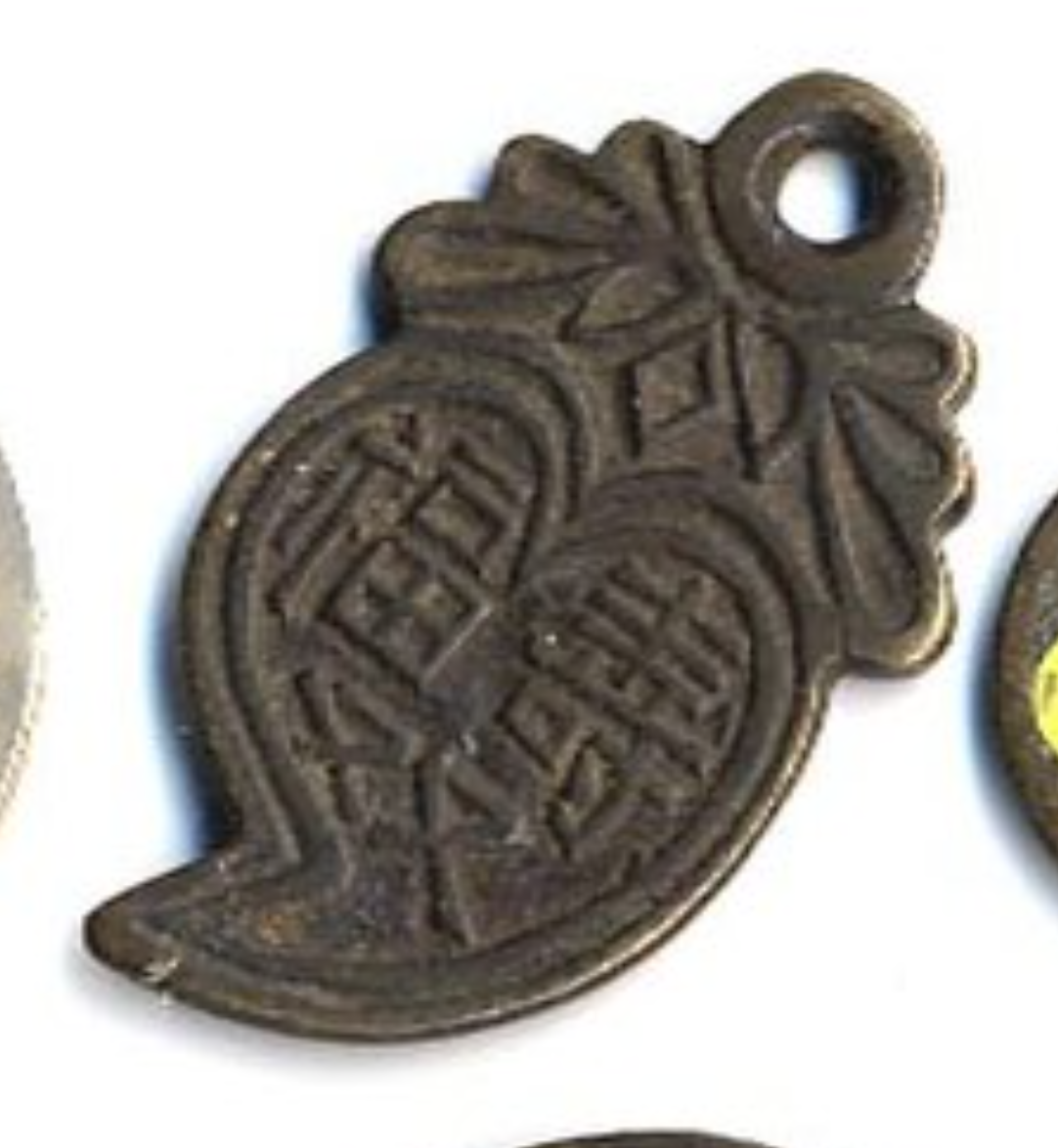
A Chinese peach charm for "good luck" (福) and "longevity" (壽).

Chinese peach charms (Traditional Chinese: 桃形掛牌; Simplified Chinese: 桃形挂牌; Pinyin: táo xíng guà pái) are peach-shaped charms used to wish for longevity. The ancient Chinese believed the peach tree possessed vitality, as its blossoms appeared before its leaves sprouted. Chinese Emperors would write the character for longevity (壽) to those of the lowest social class if they had reached high ages, which was seen to be among the greatest gifts. This character often appears on peach charms and other Chinese numismatic charms. Peach charms also often depict the Queen Mother of the West or carry inscriptions such as "long life" (長命, cháng mìng). Peach charms were also used to wish for wealth, depicting the character "富", or higher Mandarin ranks, using the character "貴".

==== Little shoe charms ====
Little shoe charms are based on the association of shoes with fertility and the Chinese feminine ideal of small feet, which in Confucianism is associated with a narrow vagina, something the ancient Chinese saw as a sexually desirable trait to allow for the birth of more male offspring. Intervention to create small feet was usually accomplished by foot binding from a young age. Girls would hang little shoe charms over their beds in the belief that it would help them find love. Chinese little shoe charms tend to be around one inch (25 mm) long. Shoes are also associated with wealth because their shape is similar to that of a sycee.

==== Chinese pendant charms ====
Chinese pendant charms (Traditional Chinese: 掛牌; Simplified Chinese: 挂牌; Pinyin: guà pái) are Chinese numismatic charms that are used as decorative pendants. From the beginning of the Han dynasty, Chinese people began wearing these charms around their necks or waists as pendants, or attaching them to the rafters of their houses, pagodas, temples, and other buildings, as well as to lanterns. It is believed that open-work charms may have been the first Chinese charms that were used in this fashion. Fish, lock, spade, and peach charms were worn daily, with fish and lock charms worn mainly by young children and infants. Other charms were exclusively used for specific rituals or holidays. Some Han dynasty era charms contained inscriptions such as ri ru qian jin (日入千金, "may you earn a 1,000 gold everyday"), chu xiong qu yang (除凶去央, "do away with evil and dispel calamity"), bi bing mo dang (辟兵莫當, "avoid hostilities and ward off sickness"), or chang wu xiang wang (長毋相忘, "do not forget your friends"). Others resembled contemporary cash coins with added dots and stars. Some pendant charms had a single loop, while most others also had either a square or round hole in the centre. Some Chinese pendant charms contain the Hanzi character gua (挂, "to hang"), though their form makes their purpose obvious. Although most pendant charms contain pictorial illustrations, the association of Chinese characters into new and mystical symbolic forms reached an even greater extreme when Taoists introduced "Taoist magic writing" (符文).

==== Chinese palindrome charms ====
Chinese palindrome charms are very rare Chinese numismatic charms that depict what in China is known as "palindromic poetry" (回文詩), a form which has to make sense when reading in either direction but may not be a true palindrome. Because of their rarity, Chinese palindrome charms are usually excluded from reference books on Chinese numismatic charms. A known example of a presumably Qing dynasty period Chinese palindrome charm reads "我笑他說我看他打我容他罵" ("I, laugh, he/she, talks, I, look, he/she, hits, I, am being tolerant, he/she, scolds") in this case the meaning of the words can be altered depending on how this inscription is read, as definitions may vary depending on the preceding pronoun. This charm could be read both clockwise and counter-clockwise, and tells of two sides of a combative relationship, which could be read as representing either party:

Traditional Chinese	Pinyin	Translation
笑他說我	xiào tā shuō wǒ	Laugh at him/her scolding me.
看他打我	kàn tā dǎ wǒ	Look at him/her fight me.
容他罵我	róng tā mà wǒ	Be tolerant of him/her cursing me.
我罵他容	wǒ mà tā róng	I curse and he/she is tolerant.
我打他看	wǒ dǎ tā kàn	I fight and he/she watches.
我說他笑	wǒ shuō tā xiào	I speak and he/she laughs.

The reverse side of this coin features images of thunder and clouds.

==== Chinese charms with coin inscriptions ====
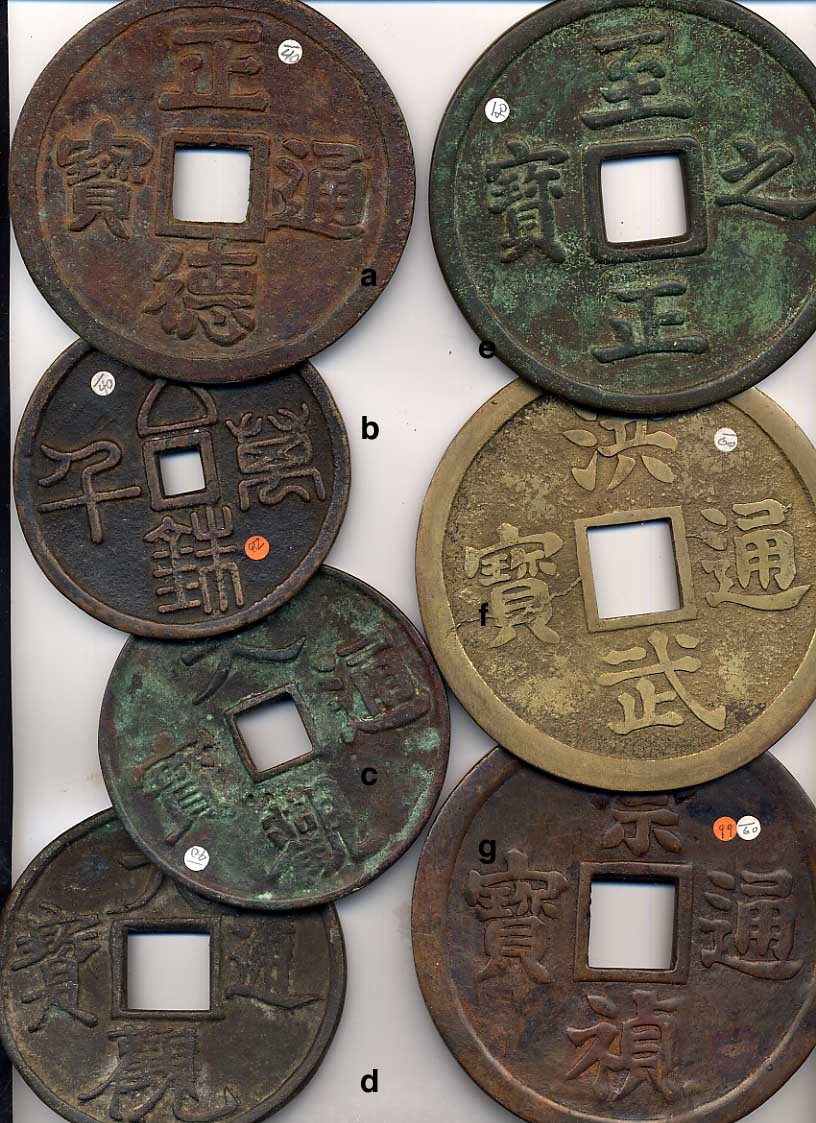
Chinese charms of various sizes with both actual and fantasy cash coin inscriptions.

Chinese charms with coin inscriptions (Traditional Chinese: 錢文錢; Simplified Chinese: 钱文钱; Pinyin: qián wén qián) featured contemporary inscriptions from circulating cash coins. These numismatic charms use the official inscriptions on government-cast coinage, owing to the mythical associations of Hanzi characters with magical powers, as well as the cultural respect for the authority of the government and its decrees. For this reason, even regular cash coins had been attributed supernatural qualities in various cultural phenomena such as folk tales and feng shui. Some official coin inscriptions already carried auspicious meanings, and these were selected for use on Chinese numismatic talismans. During times of crisis and disunity, such as under the reign of Wang Mang, the number of charms with coin inscriptions seems to have increased enormously. Meanwhile, other Chinese cash coin inscriptions were selected due to a perceived force in the metal used in the casting of these contemporary cash coins; an example would be the Later Zhou dynasty era zhōu yuán tōng bǎo (周元通寶) charm based on cash coins with the same inscription. Even after the fall of the Xin dynasty, charms were made with inscriptions from Wang Mang era coinage like the Northern Zhou era wǔ xíng dà bù (五行大布) because it could be translated as "5 elements coin". Similarly with the Later Zhou dynasty's zhōu yuán tōng bǎo (周元通寶), the Song dynasty era tài píng tōng bǎo (太平通寶), the Khitan Liao dynasty era qiān qiū wàn suì (千秋萬歲, "thousand autumns and ten thousand years"), as well as the Jurchen Jin dynasty era tài hé zhòng bǎo (泰和重寶). Northern Song dynasty-era charms may have been based on the same mother coins used to produce the official government cash coins, with different reverses to distinguish them as charms.

During the Ming dynasty, there were Chinese charms based on the hóng wǔ tōng bǎo (洪武通寶) with an image of a boy (or possibly the Emperor) riding either an ox or water buffalo. This charm became very popular because the first Ming Emperor was born a peasant, inspiring low-born people to believe they could also do great things. There were a large number of Chinese numismatic charms cast with the reign title Zheng De (正德通寶), despite the government having deprecated cash coins in favor of paper money at the time; these charms were often given as gifts to children. During the Manchu Qing dynasty a charm was cast with the inscription qián lóng tōng bǎo (乾隆通寶), but was fairly large and had the tōng bǎo (通寶) part of the cash coin written in a different style, with Manchu characters on its reverse to indicate its place of origin rotated 90 degrees. Some charms were also made to resemble the briefly cast qí xiáng zhòng bǎo (祺祥重寶) cash coins. Later charms were made to resemble the guāng xù tōng bǎo (光緒通寶) cast under the Guangxu Emperor but had dīng cái guì shòu (丁財貴壽, "May you acquire wealth, honor [high rank] and longevity") written on the reverse side of the coin.

During the 36th year of the Qianlong period (or the Gregorian year 1771), some fantasy cash coins with the inscription Qianlong Zhongbao (乾隆重寳) were cast in celebration of the Emperor's 60th birthday. Because the feast held on his 60th birthday was called Wanshoujie (萬壽節, "the party of ten thousand longevities") these numismatic charms are often referred to as wanshou qian (萬壽錢, "Currencies of the Ten Thousand Longevities").

==== Ming dynasty cloisonné charms ====
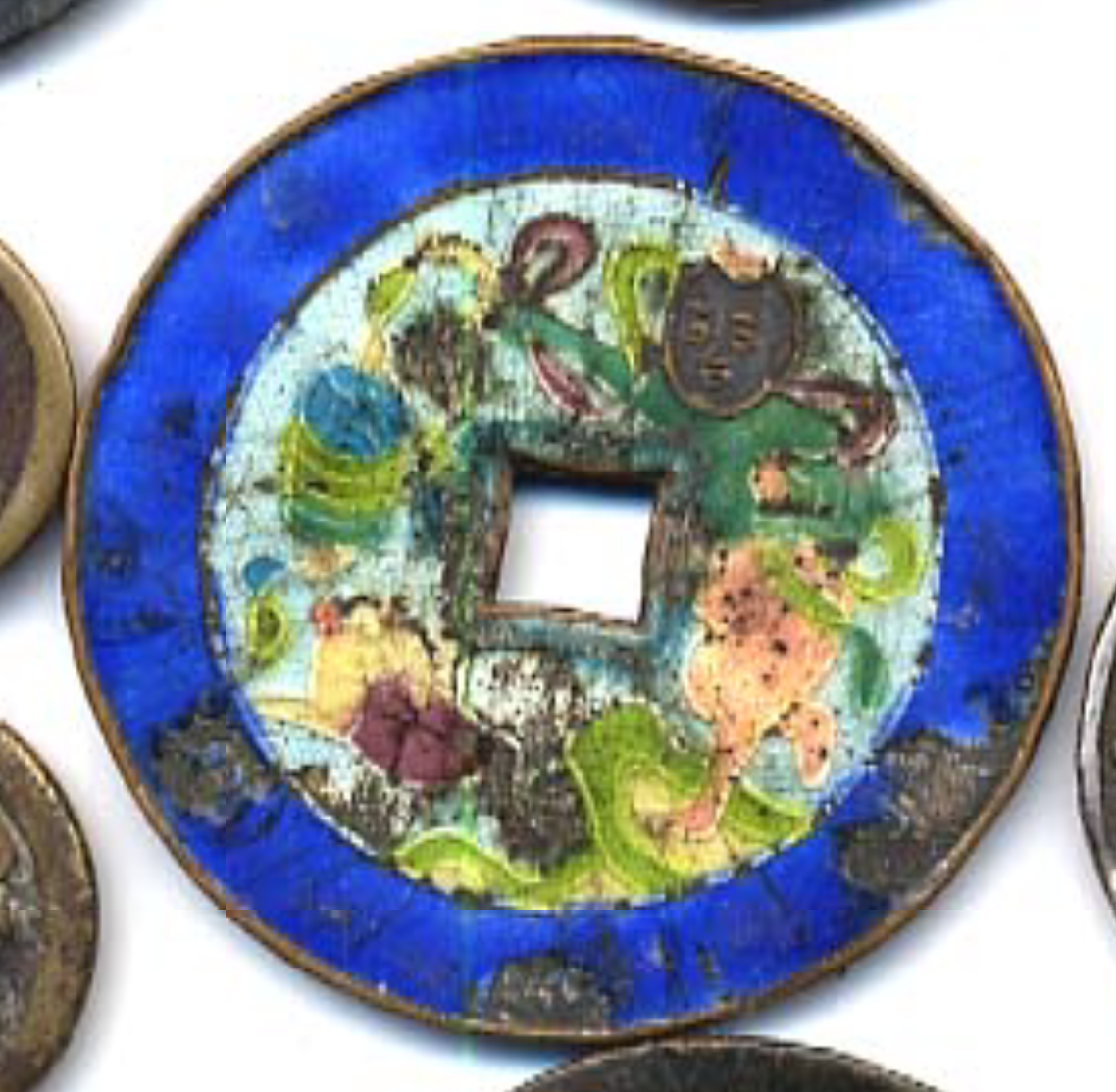
A Chinese numismatic charm that looks like a cloisonné version of a cash coin.

Ming dynasty cloisonné charms (Traditional Chinese: 明代景泰藍花錢; Simplified Chinese: 明代景泰蓝花钱; Pinyin: míng dài jǐng tài lán huā qián) are extremely scarce Chinese numismatic charms made from cloisonné rather than brass or bronze. A known cloisonné charm from the Ming dynasty has the inscription nā mó ē mí tuó fó (南無阿彌陀佛, "I put my trust in Amitābha Buddha"), with various coloured lotus blossoms between the Hanzi characters. Each colour represents something different, while the white lotus symbolises the earth's womb from which everything is born, and was the symbol of the Ming dynasty. Another known Ming dynasty era cloisonné charm has the inscription wàn lì nián zhì (萬歷年制, "Made during the [reign] of Wan Li") and the eight Buddhist treasure symbols impressed between the Hanzi characters. These treasure symbols are the umbrella, the conch shell, the flaming wheel, the endless knot, a pair of fish, the treasure vase, (Note: Also known as "the urn of wisdom".) the lotus, and the Victory Banner.

Cloisonné charms produced after the Ming dynasty (particularly those from the Qing dynasty) often have flower patterns.

==== Chinese money trees ====
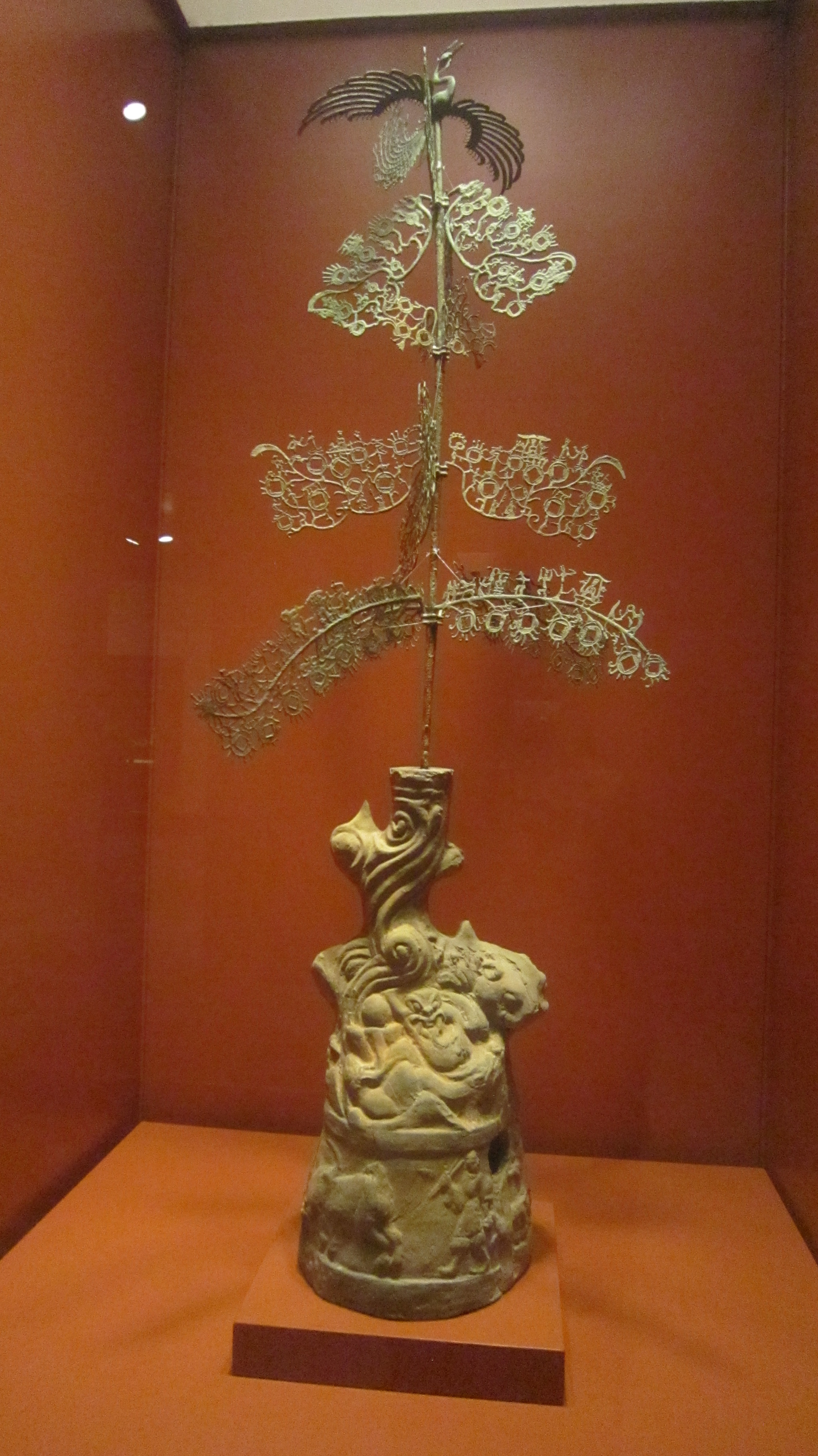
A Chinese money tree from the Han dynasty in the Hong Kong Heritage Cultural Museum.

Chinese money trees (Traditional Chinese: 搖錢樹; Simplified Chinese: 摇钱树; Pinyin: yáo qián shù), or shengxianshu, ("immortal ascension trees"), are tree-like assemblies of charms, with the leaves made from numismatic charm replicas of cash coins. These money trees should not be confused with coin trees, which are a by-product of the manufacture of cash coins, but, due to their similarities, some experts think they may have been related. Various legends from China dating to the Three Kingdoms period mention a tree that, if shaken, would cause coins to fall from its branches. Money trees, as charms, have been found in Southwest Chinese tombs from the Han dynasty and are believed to have been placed there to guide the dead to the afterlife and provide them with monetary support. According to one myth, a farmer watered the money tree seed with his sweat and watered its sapling with his blood, after which the mature tree provided eternal wealth; this implies a moral that one can only become wealthy through one's own toil. Literary sources claim that the origin of the money tree lies with the Chinese word for "copper" (銅, tóng), which is pronounced similarly to the word for "the Paulownia tree" (桐, tóng). The leaves of the Paulownia turn yellow in autumn, resembling gold or bronze coins. Chen Shou (陳壽) mentions in the Records of the Three Kingdoms that a man named Bing Yuan (邴原) walked upon a string of cash coins while strolling and, unable to discover the owner, hung it in a nearby tree; other passersby noticed this string and began hanging coins in the tree with the assumption that it was a holy tree and made wishes for wealth and luck. The earliest money trees, however, date to the Han dynasty in present-day Sichuan and to a Taoist religious order known as the Way of the Five Pecks of Rice. Archaeologists uncovered money trees as tall as 1.98 metres (6 ft 6 in), decorated with many strings of cash coins, little bronze dogs, bats, Chinese deities, elephants, deer, phoenixes, and dragons, and mounted on a bronze frame and a pottery base. Both the inscriptions and calligraphy found on Chinese money trees match those of contemporary Chinese cash coins, which typically featured replicas of Wu Zhu (五銖) coins during the Han dynasty; those from the Three Kingdoms period had inscriptions such as "Liang Zhu" (兩銖).

=== By theme ===
==== Chinese astronomy coins ====
Chinese astronomy coins (Traditional Chinese: 天象錢; Simplified Chinese: 天象钱; Pinyin: tiān xiàng qián) are charms that depict star constellations, individual stars, and other astronomical objects from ancient Chinese astronomy. They may also contain texts from the Classic of Poetry (specifically a poem entitled the "Great East" (詩經·小雅·大東), which alludes to the "Winnowing Basket" (Sagittarius) and the "Ladle" (Big Dipper).), the Four Divine Creatures, the five elements, and the Twenty-Eight Mansions (sometimes accompanied with the mint marks of the 20 mints of the Kangxi poem coins), or illustrations from the story the Cowherd and the Weaver Girl. Astronomy coins usually contain guideposts to differentiate the stars and constellations, divided into four cardinal directions.

==== Zodiac charms ====
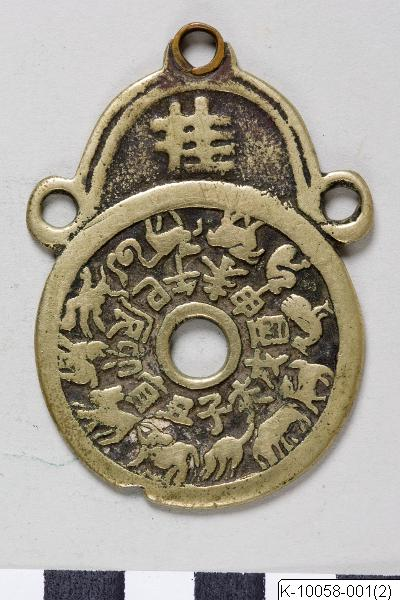
A charm depicting the 12 Chinese zodiacs on display at the Östasiatiska Museet.

Chinese zodiac charms are based on either the twelve animals or the twelve earthly branches of Chinese astrology, based on the orbit of Jupiter, and some zodiac charms feature stellar constellations. By the Spring and Autumn period, the twelve earthly branches associated with the months and the twelve animals were linked; during the Han dynasty, these also became linked to a person's year of birth. Some zodiac charms featured all twelve animals, and others might also include the twelve earthly branches. They often feature the character gua (挂), which indicates that the charm should be worn on a necklace or from the waist. Modern feng shui charms often incorporate the same zodiac-based features.

==== Eight Treasures charms ====
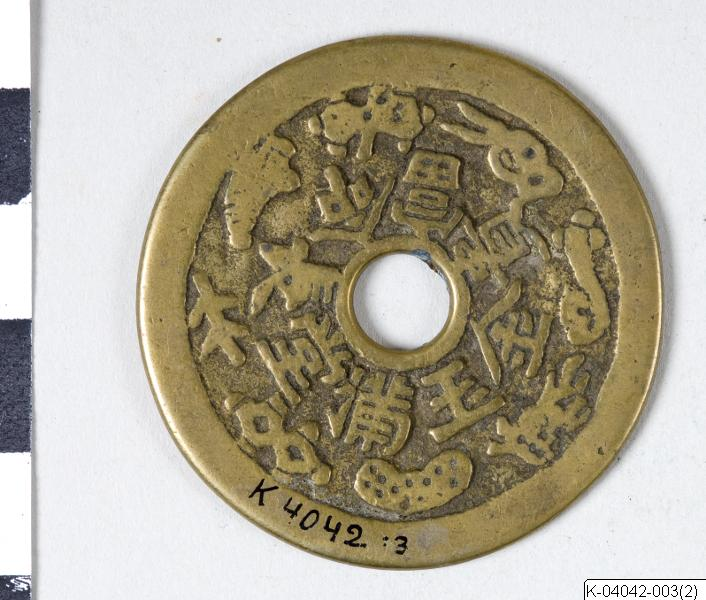
An Eight Treasures charm with the inscription 長命富貴金玉滿堂 which could be translated as "longevity, wealth and honor", "may gold and jade fill your house (halls)" on display at the Museum of Ethnography, Sweden.

Chinese Eight Treasures charms (Traditional Chinese: 八寶錢; Simplified Chinese: 八宝钱; Pinyin: bā bǎo qián) depict the Eight Treasures, also known as the "Eight Precious Things" and the "Eight Auspicious Treasures", and refer to a subset of a large group of items from antiquity known as the "Hundred Antiques" (百古) which consists of objects utilised in the writing of Chinese calligraphy such as painting brushes, ink, writing paper and ink slabs, as well as other antiques such as Chinese chess, paintings, musical instruments and various others. Those most commonly depicted on older charms are the ceremonial ruyi (sceptre), coral, lozenge, rhinoceros horns, sycees, stone chimes, and flaming pearl. Eight Treasures charms can alternatively display the eight precious organs of the Buddha's body, the eight auspicious signs, various emblems of the eight Immortals from Taoism, or eight normal Chinese characters. They often have thematic inscriptions.

==== Liu Haichan and the Three-Legged Toad charms ====
These charms depict Taoist transcendent Liu Haichan, one of the most popular figures on Chinese charms, and the Jin Chan (money frog). The symbolism of these charms has regional differences, as in some varieties of Chinese the character "chan" has a pronunciation very similar to that of "coin" (錢 qián). The mythical Jin Chan lives on the moon, and these charms symbolize a wish for the "unattainable". This can be interpreted as attracting good fortune to the charm's holder, or that the attainment of money can lure a person to their downfall.

==== The Book of Changes and Bagua charms (Eight Trigram charms) ====
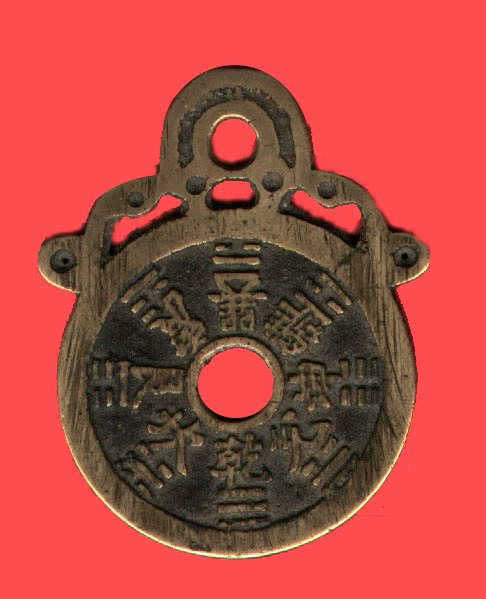
A Chinese amulet with the 8 trigrams.

Chinese charms depicting subjects from the I Ching (a.k.a. The Book of Changes) are used to invoke the cosmic principles associated with divination in ancient China, such as simplicity, variability, and persistence. Bagua charms may also depict the Bagua (the Eight Trigrams of Taoist cosmology). Bagua charms commonly feature depictions of trigrams, the Yin Yang symbol, Neolithic jade cong's (琮), the Ruyi sceptre, bats, and cash coins.

Book of Changes and Bagua charms are alternatively known as Yinyang charms (Traditional Chinese: 陰陽錢) because the taijitu is often found with the eight trigrams. This is also a popular theme for Vietnamese numismatic charms and many Vietnamese versions contain the same designs and inscriptions.

==== Five poisons talismans ====
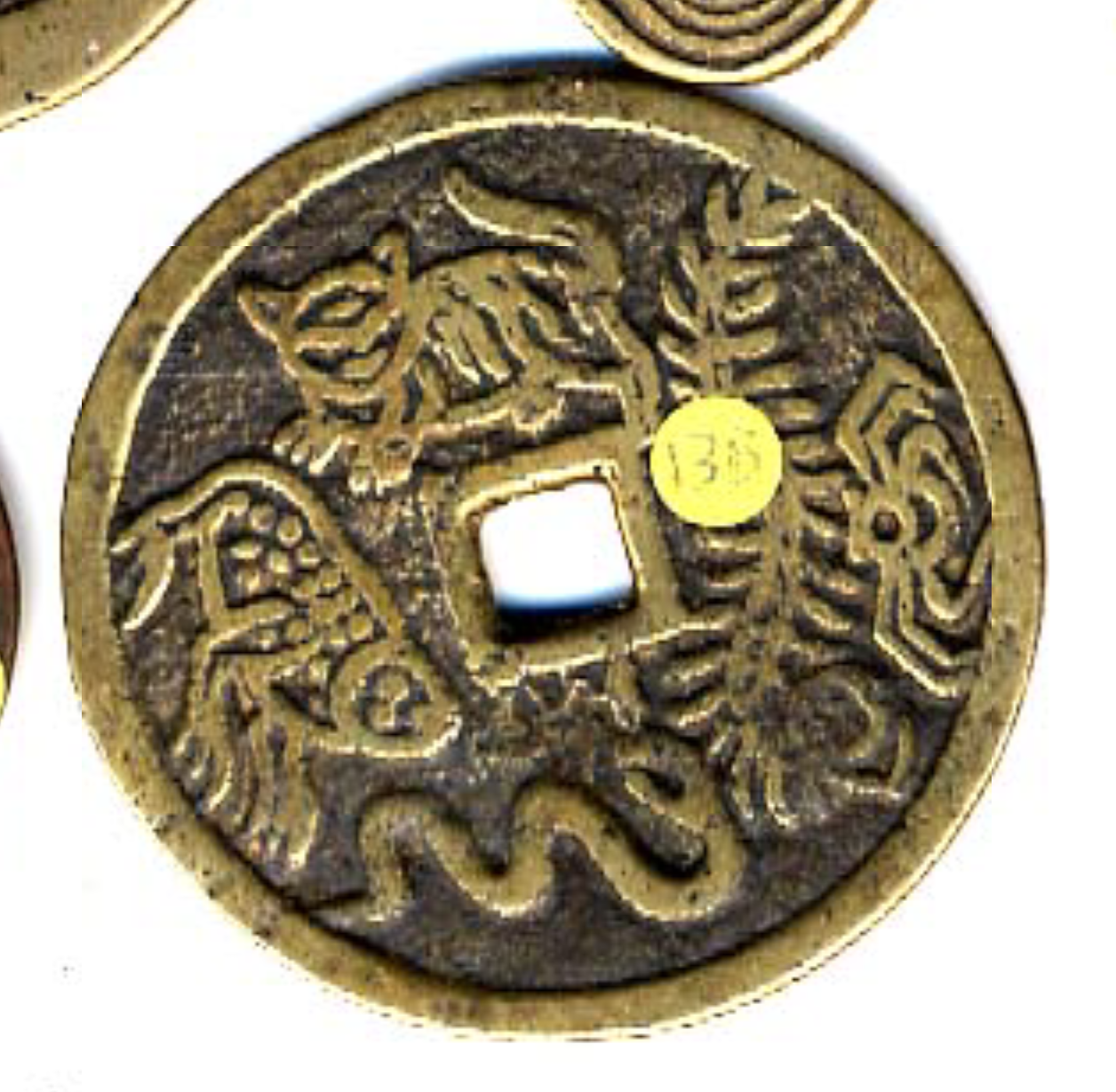
A coin amulet that depicts a snake, a spider, a centipede, a toad, and a tiger.

Five poisons talismans (五毒錢) are Chinese charms decorated with inscriptions and images related to the fifth day of the fifth month of the Chinese calendar (天中节), the most inauspicious day according to tradition. This day marked the start of summer, which was accompanied by dangerous animals, the spread of infectious diseases, and the alleged appearance of evil spirits. These animals included the five poisons (五毒): snakes, scorpions, centipedes, toads, and spiders. These are often depicted on five-poison talismans, or possibly with lizards, the three-legged toad, or the tiger. The ancient Chinese believed that poison could only be thwarted with poison, and that the amulet would counter the hazardous effects of the animals displayed. An example of a five poisons charm bears the legend "五日午时" ("noon of the 5th day"), and the amulets were commonly worn on that day.

==== Eight Decalitres of Talent charms ====
The Eight Decalitres of Talent charm is a Qing dynasty-era handmade charm featuring four characters. The rim is painted blue, the left and right characters are painted green, and the top and bottom characters are painted orange. The inscription bā dòu zhī cái (八鬥之才), which could be translated as "eight decalitres of talent", is a reference to a story in which Cao Zhi struggled with his brother Cao Pi, under the belief that he was oppressed out of envy for his talents. The inscription was devised by the Eastern Jin dynasty poet Xie Lingyun, referring to a saying that talent was divided into ten pieces and Cao Zhi received eight of the ten.

==== Tiger Hour charms ====
Tiger Hour charms are modeled after the Northern Zhou dynasty wǔ xíng dà bù (五行大布, "Large Coin of the Five Elements") cash coins, (Note: It is very common for Chinese numismatic charms to adopt the calligraphy used on this coin.) but tend to have a round hole rather than a square hole. The reverse of these charms feature the inscription yín shí (寅時), which is a reference to the shichen of the tiger (the "tiger hour"), and have an image of a tiger and a lucky cloud.

==== "Cassia and Orchid" charms ====
"Cassia and Orchid" charms are extremely rare Chinese numismatic charms dating to the Manchu Qing dynasty with the inscription guì zi lán sūn (桂子蘭孫, "cassia seeds and orchid grandsons"). These charms use the Mandarin Chinese word for Cinnamomum cassia (桂, guì) as a pun, because it sounds similar to the Mandarin Chinese word for "honourable" (貴, guì) while the word for "seed" is also a homonym for "son". The Mandarin Chinese word for orchid (蘭, lán) refers to zhī lán (芝蘭, "of noble character"), which in this context means "noble grandsons". The inscription on the reverse side of this charm reads róng huá fù guì (榮華富貴, "high position and great wealth"), describing the wish to produce sons and grandsons who would pass the imperial examination and attain a great rank as a mandarin.

==== Men Plow, Women Weave charms ====
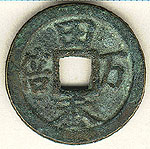
A Men Plow, Women Weave charm with the inscription "田蚕万倍".

Men Plow, Women Weave charms (Traditional Chinese: 男耕女織錢; Simplified Chinese: 男耕女织钱; Pinyin: nán gēng nǚ zhī qián) are Chinese numismatic charms depicting scenes related to the production of rice and sericulture. The charms can feature inscriptions such as tián cán wàn bèi (田蠶萬倍, "may your [rice] fields and silkworms increase 10,000 times") on their obverse and may have images of a spotted deer on their reverse.

The strict division of the sexes, apparent in the policy that "men plow, women weave" (Chinese: 男耕女织), partitioned male and female histories as early as the Zhou dynasty, with the Rites of Zhou even stipulating that women be educated specifically in "women's rites" (Chinese: 陰禮; pinyin: yīnlǐ).

==== Chinese Boy charms ====
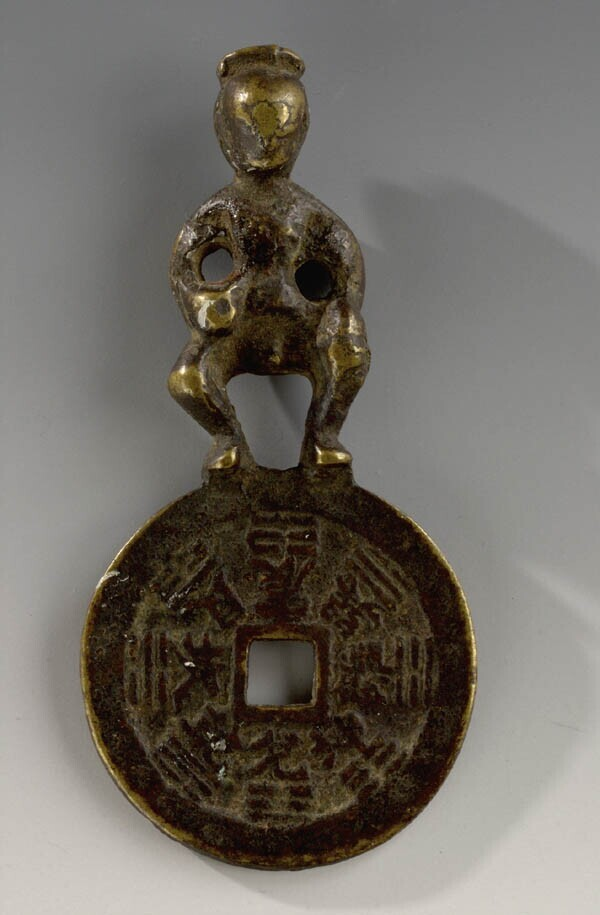
A Chinese boy charm on display at Museon, The Hague.

Chinese Boy charms (Traditional Chinese: 童子連錢; Simplified Chinese: 童子连钱; Pinyin: tóng zǐ lián qián) are Chinese numismatic charms that depict images of boys in the hope that these charms would cause more boys to be born in the family of the holder. They usually have an eyelet for carrying, hanging, or wearing, and are more commonly found in Southern China. The traditional ideal for a Chinese family was to have five sons and two daughters, with boys preferred for filial piety, carrying on the family lineage, and qualifying for the imperial examination. The boys depicted on these charms are often in a position of reverence. Some boy charms contain inscriptions such as tóng zǐ lián qián (童子連錢), which link male offspring to monetary wealth. Boy statuettes belonging to boy charms can also be found on top of open-work charms. Some boy charms contain images of lotus seeds because the Chinese word for lotus sounds similar to "continuous" and symbolizes continuity through the male line.

==== Charms with musicians, dancers, and acrobats ====
Chinese charms with "barbarian" musicians, dancers, and acrobats (Traditional Chinese: 胡人樂舞雜伎錢; Simplified Chinese: 胡人乐舞杂伎钱; Pinyin: hú rén yuè wǔ zá jì qián) appeared during either the Khitan Liao or the Chinese Song dynasty. These charms generally depict four individuals, of which one is doing an acrobatic stunt (such as a handstand) while the others are playing various musical instruments: a four-string instrument which might be a ruan, a flute, and a wooden fish. Although most numismatic catalogs refer to these charms as depicting "barbarians" or huren (胡人, literally "bearded people"), the characters depicted on these charms have no beards. The reverse side of these charms depicts four children or babies playing and enjoying themselves, a common feature of Liao dynasty charms; above them is a figure resembling a baby who appears to be riding something.

==== Chinese treasure bowl charms ====
Chinese treasure bowl charms are Chinese numismatic charms that feature references to the mythical "treasure bowl" (聚寶盆), which would usually grant unending wealth to those who hold it but may also be responsible for great sorrow. These charms are pendants with an image of the treasure bowl filled with various objects from the eight treasures on one side and the inscription píng ān jí qìng (平安吉慶, "Peace and Happiness") on the reverse. The loop of the charm is the form of a dragon; the string would be placed between the legs and the tail of the dragon, while the dragon's head looks upward from the bottom of the charm.

Another type of Chinese "treasure bowl" charm has the obverse inscription Zhaocai Jinbao (招財進寳), these charms have dragon-shaped swivel.

==== Confucian charms ====
Confucian charms are Chinese numismatic charms that depict the traditions, rituals, and moral code of Confucianism, such as filial piety and "righteousness". Examples of Confucian charms would include a charm that depicts Shenzi carrying firewood on a shoulder pole, open-work charms depicting stories from "The Twenty-Four Examples of Filial Piety" (二十四孝), the "five relationships" (五倫), Meng Zong kneeling beside bamboo, Dong Yong (a Han dynasty era man) working a hoe, Wang Xiang with a fishing pole. Confucian inscriptions include fù cí zǐ xiào (父慈子孝, "the father is kind and the son is filial") read clockwise, yí chū fèi fǔ (義出肺腑, "righteousness comes from the bottom of one's heart"), zhōng jūn xiào qīn (忠君孝親, "be loyal to the sovereign and honor one's parents"), huā è shuāng huī (花萼雙輝, "petals and sepals both shine"), and jìng xiōng ài dì (敬兄愛第, "revere older brothers and love younger brothers").

==== Taoist charms ====
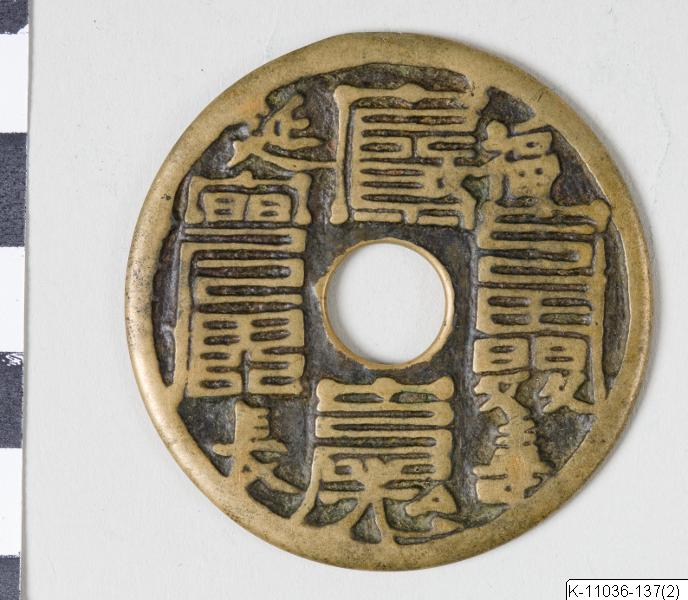
A Taoist charm that contains Taoist "magic writing" on display at the Museum of Ethnography, Sweden.

Taoist charms (Traditional Chinese: 道教品壓生錢; Simplified Chinese: 道教品压生钱; Pinyin: dào jiào pǐn yā shēng qián) are Chinese numismatic charms that contain inscriptions and images related to Taoism. Since ancient times, the Chinese have attributed magical powers and influence to Hanzi characters. They believed that certain characters could influence spirits, which, in turn, were believed to be responsible for good and ill fortune. The Huainanzi describes spirits as horror-stricken when commanded by the magical powers of Hanzi characters used in amulets and charms. Many early Han dynasty talismans were worn as pendants bearing inscriptions that requested deified figures in Taoism to protect their wearers. Some Taoist charms contain inscriptions based on Taoist "magic writing" (Chinese: 符文, also known as Taoist magic script characters, Taoist magic figures, Taoist magic formulas, Taoist secret talismanic writing, and Talismanic characters), which is a secret writing style regarded as part of Fulu. Its techniques are passed down from Taoist priests to their students and vary across Taoist sects, with a secrecy that has led many to believe they are more effective at controlling the will of the spirits.

As most of these charms asked Leigong (the Taoist God of Thunder) to kill evil spirits or bogies, these numismatic charms are often called "Lei Ting" charms (雷霆錢) or "Lei Ting curse" charms. As imperial decrees held absolute authority, this reinforced the popular myth that Hanzi characters were somehow magical and inspired Chinese talismans to take the form of imperial decrees. Many Taoist talismans read as if by a high-rank official commanding the evil spirits and bogies with inscriptions such as "let it [the command] be executed as fast as Lü Ling", (Note: Lü Ling was an ancient Chinese runner from the Zhou dynasty during the Mu Wang era in the 10th century BC.) "quickly, quickly, this is an order", and "[pay] respect [to] this command". Taoist talismans can contain either square holes or round ones. Many Taoist amulets and charms contain images of Liu Haichan, Zhenwu, the Bagua, yin-yang symbols, constellations, Laozi, swords, bats, and immortals.

During the Song dynasty, some Taoist charms depicting the "Quest for Longevity" were cast. These contain images of an immortal, an incense burner, a crane, and a tortoise on the obverse and Taoist "magic writing" on the reverse. Taoist charms containing the quest for immortality are a common motif, and reproductions of this charm were commonly made after the Song period. Some Taoist charms from the Qing dynasty contain images of Lü Dongbin with the inscription fú yòu dà dì (孚佑大帝, "Great Emperor of Trustworthy Protection"). This charm notably contains a round hole.

A Taoist charm from either the Jin or Yuan dynasty without any written text shows what is commonly believed to be either a "boy under a pine tree" (松下童子) or a "boy worshipping an immortal" (童子拜仙人), but an alternative hypothesis is that this charm depicts a meeting between Laozi and Zhang Daoling. This is based on the figure supposedly representing Zhang Daoling carrying a cane, which in Mandarin Chinese is a homophone for "Zhang". On the reverse side of the charm are the twelve Chinese zodiacs, each in a circle surrounded by what is referred to as "auspicious clouds", which number eight.

==== Buddhist charms and temple coins ====
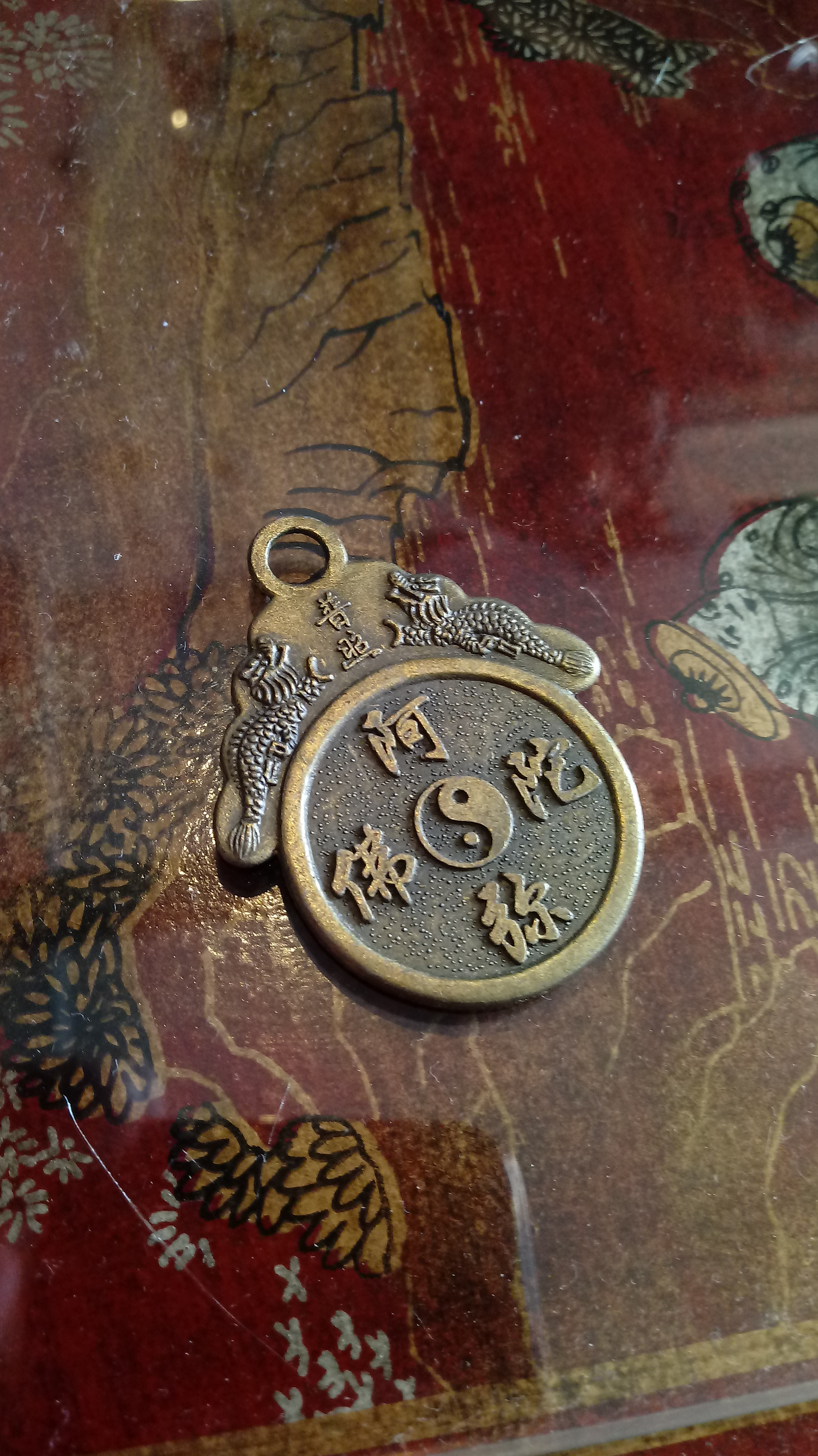
A Buddhist numismatic charm with the inscription ē mí tuó fó (阿彌陀佛) referring to the Amitābha Buddha in Delft, the Netherlands.

Buddhist charms (Traditional Chinese: 佛教品壓勝錢; Simplified Chinese: 佛教品压胜钱; Pinyin: fó jiào pǐn yā shēng qián) are Chinese numismatic charms that display Buddhist symbols of mostly Mahayana Buddhism. These charms can have inscriptions in both Chinese and Sanskrit (while those with Sanskrit inscriptions did not appear until the Ming dynasty), these charms generally contain blessings from the Amitābha Buddha such as coins with the inscription ē mí tuó fó (阿彌陀佛).

Temple coins often bore inscriptions calling for compassion and requesting that the Buddha protect their holders. Most temple coins are small. Some of them contain mantras from the Heart Sūtra. Some Buddhist charms are pendants dedicated to the Bodhisattva Guanyin. Common symbols are the lotus, which is associated with the Buddha, and the banana, which is associated with Vanavasa. Less commonly, some Buddhist charms also contain Taoist symbolism, including Taoist "magic writing" script. There are Buddhist charms based on the Ming dynasty era hóng wǔ tōng bǎo (洪武通寶), but larger.

===== Japanese Buddhist charms in China =====
Japanese Buddhist monks brought large numbers of Japanese numismatic charms to China. Frequently encountered is the Buddhist qiě kōng cáng qì (且空藏棄) which was cast in Japan from 1736 to 1740 during the Tokugawa shogunate, and dedicated to the Ākāśagarbha Bodhisattva based on one of the favourite mantras of Kūkai. Ākāśagarbha is one of the eight immortals who attempt to free people from the cycle of reincarnation with compassion. Another Japanese Buddhist charm frequently found in China has the inscription nā mó ē mí tuó fó (南無阿彌陀佛, "I put my trust in [the] Amitābha Buddha").

==== Chinese talismans with sword symbolism ====
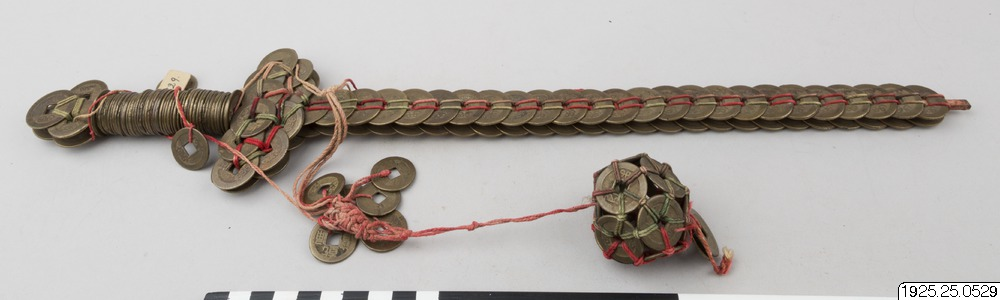
A Chinese coin sword-shaped talisman made from Qing dynasty era cash coins on display at the Museum of Ethnography, Sweden.

Swords are a common theme on Chinese numismatic charms, and coins were often assembled into sword-shaped talismans. Most Chinese numismatic charms featuring swords depict a single sword. According to Chinese legend, the first swords in China appeared during the reign of the Yellow Emperor. During the Spring and Autumn period, the notion developed that swords could be used against evil spirits and demons. Under the Liu Song dynasty, swords became a common instrument in religious rituals, most particularly in Taoist rituals; according to the Daoist Rituals of the Mystery Cavern and Numinous Treasure (洞玄靈寶道學科儀), it was essential for students of Taoism to be able to forge swords which could dispel demonic entities. Many Taoist sects formed during this period believed that swords could defeat demons and possessed medicinal properties. Under the Sui and Tang dynasties, ritualistic swords constructed of peach wood started to appear. Around this time, Chinese amulets with sword themes began to be produced; often, these amulets resembled Chinese cash coins but featured crossed swords decorated with ribbons or fillets, as the ancient Chinese believed these items enhanced the powers of whatever they were tied to. Chinese swords were commonly engraved with imagery of the Big Dipper, which was believed to have unlimited magical power, and this imagery also became common in charms featuring swords.

The image of two swords on Chinese amulets stems from a legend where Taoist leader Zhang Daoling saw Laozi appear to him on a mountain in present-day Sichuan and gave him two swords. Alternatively, two swords can represent two dragons from a legend in which a man named Lei Huan (雷煥) received two swords and gave one to his son Lei Hua (雷華), who lost it in a river; a servant tasked with retrieving it witnessed two coiled, entwined Chinese dragons.

Another popular way swords are integrated into Chinese numismatic talismans is by stringing actual or replica cash coins into a sword shape. In feng shui, these coin-swords are often hung to frighten away demons and evil spirits. Chinese talismans of swordsmen usually depict one of the Taoist immortals Zhong Kui or Lu Dongbin. Swordsmen also appear on zodiac charms, Bagua charms, elephant chess pieces, lock charms, and other Chinese numismatic charms. Another person who appears on Chinese amulets is Zhenwu, who is regarded as the perfect warrior.

A common inscription on Chinese sword charms is qū xié jiàng fú (驅邪降福, "Expel evil and send down good fortune [happiness]"), but most commonly these charms feature inscriptions or "imperial orders"/"edicts" (敕令, chì lìng) commanding demons and evil spirits to be expelled. Sometimes an image of a calamus is used, as the leaves of this plant resemble a sword.

=== By other purpose ===
==== Horse coins ====
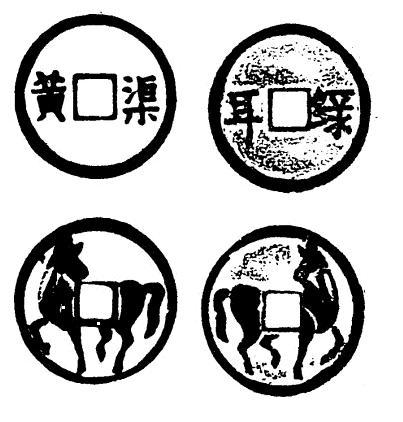
Two examples of Chinese horse coins

Horse coins (Traditional Chinese: 馬錢; Pinyin: mǎ qián) were a type of Chinese charm that originated in the Song dynasty. Most horse coins tend to be round, three centimeters in diameter, with a circular or square hole. The horses featured on these coins are depicted in various positions. Their historical use is unknown, though they are speculated to have been used as game board pieces or gambling counters. Horse coins were most often manufactured from copper or bronze, though there are a few documented cases of manufacture from animal horn or ivory. The horse coins produced during the Song dynasty are considered to be of the best quality and craftsmanship and tend to be made from better metal than those which followed.

Horse coins often depicted famous horses from Chinese history, while commemorative horse coins would also feature riders. An example is the coin "General Yue Yi of the State of Yan" which commemorates a Yan attempt to conquer the city of Jimo.

==== Xiangqi pieces ====
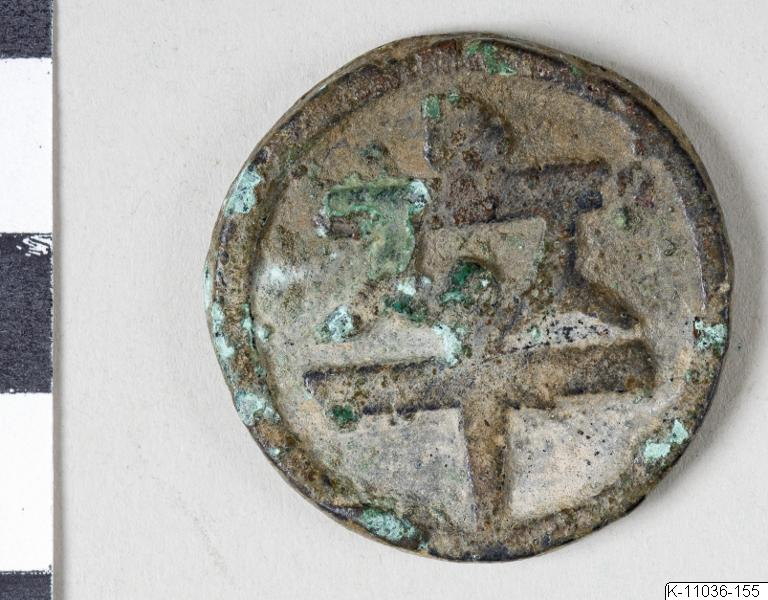
An ancient Chinese metal xiangqi piece on display at the Museum of Ethnography, Sweden.

The game of xiangqi (a.k.a. Chinese chess) was originally played with either metallic or porcelain pieces, and these were often collected and studied by those with an interest in Chinese cash coins, charms and horse coins. These coins are regarded as a type of Chinese charm and are divided into the following categories:

- Elephants (象)
- Soldiers (卒)
- Generals (将)
- Horses (马)
- Chariots (車)
- Guards (士)
- Canons (炮)
- Palaces (宫)
- Rivers (河)

The earliest known Xiangqi pieces date to the Chongning era (1102–1106) of the Song dynasty and were unearthed in the province of Jiangxi in 1984. Xianqi pieces were also found along the Silk Road in provinces like Xinjiang; they were also used by the Tanguts of the Western Xia dynasty.

==== Chinese football charms ====
During the Song dynasty, Chinese numismatic charms were cast that depict people playing the sport of cuju, a form of football. These charms display four images of football players in various positions around the square hole in the middle of the coin. The reverse side of the coin depicts a dragon and a phoenix, which are traditional symbols of men and women, possibly indicating the sport's unisex nature.

==== Chinese "World of Brightness" coins ====
During the late Qing dynasty, cast coinage was slowly replaced by machine-struck coinage. At the same time, machine-struck charms with the inscription guāng míng shì jiè (光明世界, "World of Brightness") started appearing that looked very similar to the contemporary milled guāng xù tōng bǎo (光緒通寶) cash coins. There are three variations of the "World of Brightness" coin: the most common one features the same Manchu characters on the reverse as the contemporary guāng xù tōng bǎo cash coins, indicating that this coin was produced at the Guangzhou mint. Another version has the same inscription on the reverse side of the coin, while a third variant has nine stars on the reverse. Modern numismatists haven't determined the meaning, purpose, or origin of these charms. One hypothesis proposes that these coins were a form of hell money because it is thought that "World of Brightness" in this context would be a euphemism for "world of darkness", which is how the Chinese refer to death. Another hypothesis suggests that these coins were gambling tokens. A third proposes that these coins were used by the Heaven and Earth Society because the Hanzi character míng (明) is a component of the name of the Ming dynasty (明朝), which meant that the inscription guāng míng (光明) could be read as "the glory of the Ming".

==== Paizi designs featured on Chinese numismatic charms ====
In November 2018, Dr. Helen Wang of the British Museum posted an article on the website Chinese money matters in which she noted that the British Museum possessed Chinese talismans featuring designs based on paizi (牌子). According to Wang, the Chinese author Dr. Alex Chengyu Fang mentions these charms as "Hanging plaques and charms of unusual shapes" (掛牌與異形錢) in his 2008 book Chinese Charms: Art, Religion and Folk Belief (中國花錢與傳統文化), and also notes that some of these pieces depict lingpai (令牌). Wang also mentions that the American Gary Ashkenazy noted examples of "pendant charms" (挂牌) with these designs on his Primaltrek website. Based on later comments made by Andrew West Tangut characters appeared on paizi produced in the Western Xia and comments by Fang made on Twitter were noted by Wang that paizi inspired designs not only appeared on rectangular talismans but also on cash coin-shaped charms where the paizi is featured directly above the square centre hole, and often feature Chinese zodiacs in their designs. The British Museum is also in possession of Chinese talismans with these designs, which they acquired from the Tamba Collection (which was originally in the hands of Kutsuki Masatsuna, 1750–1802).

=== Chinese cash coins with charm features ===
Many government-issued cash coins and other currencies, such as Spade and Knife money, that lacked extra charm-like features were considered to have "charm-like qualities" and were treated as charms by some people. The Wang Mang era knife coin, with a nominal value of 5,000 cash coins, was often seen as a charm by the people because the character 千 (for 1,000) is very similar to the character 子, which means "son". The inscription of the knife coin could be read as "worth five sons". A coin from Shu Han with a nominal value of 100 Wu Zhu cash coins featured a fish on the reverse, alongside the inscription, which symbolises "abundance" and "perseverance" in Chinese culture. Another Shu Han-era coin bore the inscription tai ping bai qian which was taken as an omen of peace, and this coin is often considered a peace charm. During the Jin dynasty a coin was issued with the inscription fēng huò (豐貨) which could be translated as "(the) coin of abundance"; possessing it was believed to be economically beneficial, and it was popularly known as the "cash of riches".

During the Tang dynasty, images of clouds, crescents, and stars were often added to coins, which the Chinese continued to use in subsequent dynasties. During the Jurchen Jin dynasty, coins were cast with reverse inscriptions that featured characters from the twelve earthly branches and ten heavenly stems. During the Ming dynasty, stars were sometimes used decoratively on some official government-produced cash coins. Under the Manchu Qing dynasty yōng zhèng tōng bǎo (雍正通寶) cash coins cast by the Lanzhou Mint were considered to be charms or amulets capable of warding against evil spirits and demons because the Manchu word "gung" looked similar to the broadsword used by the Chinese God of war, Emperor Guan.

The commemorative kāng xī tōng bǎo (康熙通寶) cast for the Kangxi Emperor's 60th birthday in 1713 was believed to have "the powers of a charm" immediately when it entered circulation. It contains a slightly different version of the Hanzi symbol "熙" at the bottom of the cash, which lacks the vertical line common to the left part of the character; the part of this symbol that is usually inscribed as "臣" has the middle part written as a "口" instead. Notably, the upper left area of the symbol "通" contains a single dot as opposed to the usual two dots used during this era. Several myths were attributed to this coin over the following 300 years; one of these myths was that the coin was cast from golden statues of the 18 disciples of the Buddha, which earned this coin the nicknames "the Lohan coin" and "Arhat money". It was given to children as yā suì qián (壓歲錢) during Chinese New Year, some women wore it as an engagement ring, and in rural Shanxi, young men wore this like golden teeth. The coin was made of a copper alloy, but it was not uncommon for people to enhance it with gold leaf.

==== Chinese star charms ====
Chinese star charms refers to Song dynasty era dà guān tōng bǎo (大觀通寶) cash coins that depict star constellations on the reverse side of the coin. These coins are often considered to be among the most beautiful Chinese cash coins because of their "slender gold" script (瘦金書), which was written by Emperor Huizong. This coin was used to make star charms because the word guān means star gazing and is a compound word for astronomy and astrology.

==== Chinese poem coins ====
Chinese poem coins (Traditional Chinese: 詩錢; Simplified Chinese: 诗钱; Pinyin: shī qián, alternatively 二十錢局名) are Chinese cash coins cast under the Kangxi Emperor, a Manchu Emperor known for his poetry who wrote the work Illustrations of Plowing and Weaving (耕織圖) in 1696. The coins produced under the Kangxi Emperor all had the obverse inscription Kāng Xī Tōng Bǎo (康熙通寶) and had the Manchu character ᠪᠣᠣ (Boo, building) on the left side of the square hole and the name of the mint on the right. As the name Kangxi was composed of the characters meaning "health" (康) and "prosperous" (熙) the Kāng Xī Tōng Bǎo cash coins were viewed as having auspicious properties. As the cash coins were produced at twenty-three mints, some people placed these coins together to form poems in adherence to the rules of Classical Chinese poetry. These coins were always placed together to form the following poems:

Traditional Chinese	Pinyin
同福臨東江	tóng fú lín dōng jiāng
宣原蘇薊昌	xuān yuán sū jì chāng
南寧河廣浙	nán níng hé guǎng zhè
台桂陝雲漳	tái guì shǎn yún zhāng

The strung "charm" of twenty coins, also known as "set coins" (套子錢), was seen as inconvenient to carry. Charms were thus produced that had ten of the twenty mint marks on each side of the coin. These charms were also distinguished from the actual cash coins by having round holes. They were sometimes painted red, as a lucky colour, and sometimes had inscriptions wishing for good fortunes, such as:

Traditional Chinese	Translation
金玉滿堂	"may gold and jade fill your halls"
大位高升	"may you be promoted to a high position"
五子登科	"may your five sons achieve great success in the imperial examinations"
福祿壽喜	"good fortune, emolument [official salary], longevity, and happiness"
吉祥如意	"may your good fortune be according to your wishes"

Kāng Xī Tōng Bǎo cash coins produced at the Ministry of Revenue and the Ministry of Public Works in the capital city of Beijing are excluded from these poems.

== Chinese Numismatic Charms Museum ==
On 1 February 2015, a Chinese Numismatic Charms Museum (Traditional Chinese: 中國古代民俗錢幣博物館; Simplified Chinese: 中国古代民俗钱币博物馆; Pinyin: zhōng guó gǔ dài mín sú qián bì bó wù guǎn) was opened in the Hainanese city of Haikuo. This museum is located in a building that is a replica of the Szechuan Kanting Civilian Commercial Bank in Movie Town Haikou, and has exhibition areas that cover around 530 square metres (5,700 sq ft). The museum's collection includes both Chinese coins and paper money, and contains more than 2,000 Chinese numismatic charms dating from the Han dynasty to the Republic of China.

== Charms from ethnic minorities ==
=== Liao dynasty charms ===
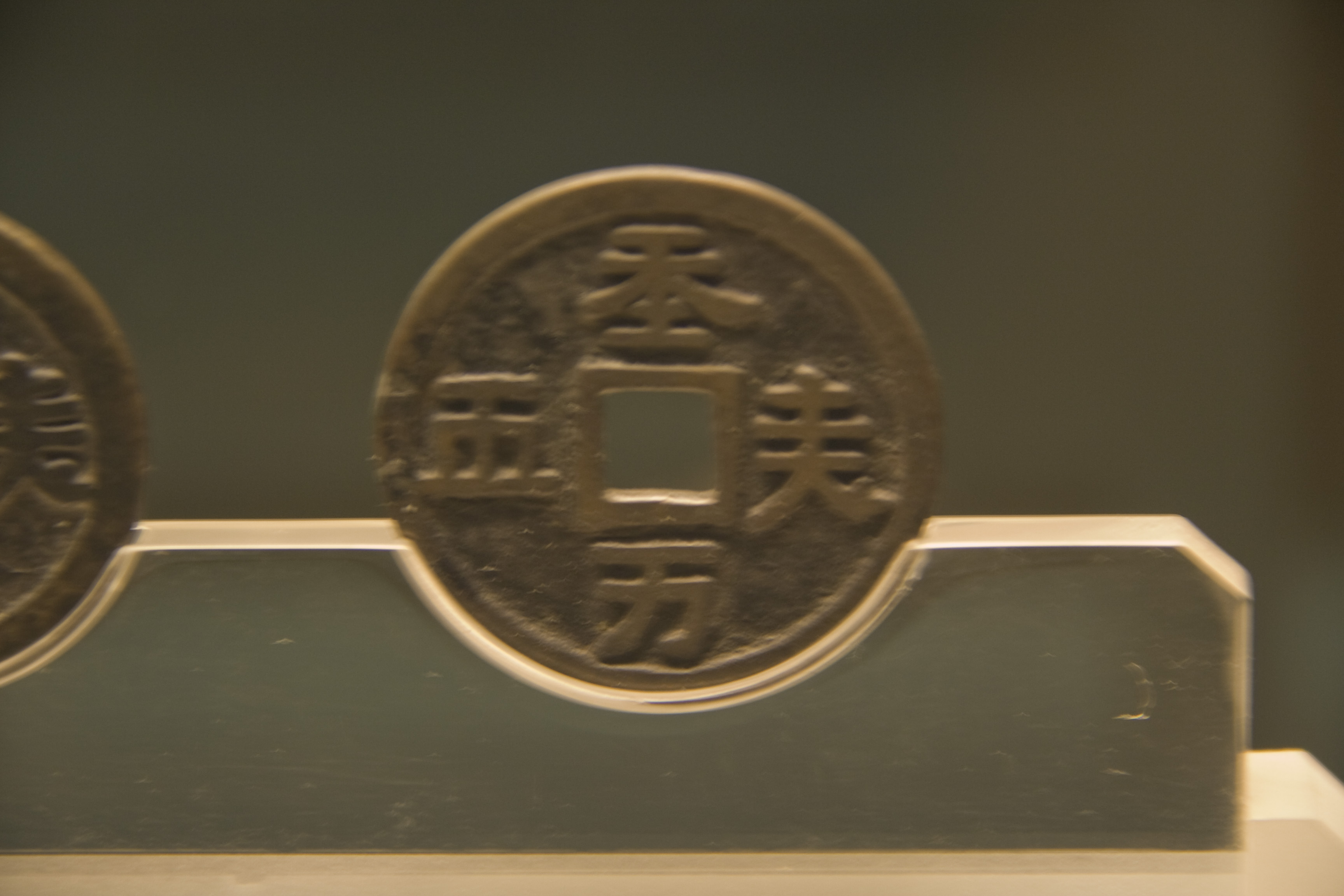
A Liao dynasty period charm with Khitan script on display at the Shanghai Museum.

Liao dynasty charms are Chinese numismatic charms produced during the Khitan Liao dynasty that are written in Khitan script and, unlike Liao dynasty coins, were read counter-clockwise. Because the Khitan script hasn't been completely deciphered, these rare charms aren't fully understood by modern experts. Some Liao dynasty era charms had no inscriptions at all, and are not well understood as the Khitan people may have interpreted certain symbols differently from the Chinese. One of the most well-known Liao dynasty charms is the "Mother of Nine Sons" charm, which bears no inscription. It depicts three groups of three people, believed to be the sons of the woman riding a dragon on the other side; these groups are believed to symbolise the three levels of the imperial examination system. A more recent hypothesis proposes that the person riding the dragon is the Yellow Emperor returning to the heavens and that the people represent the Nine Provinces (九州).

=== Charms of the Sui people ===
In 2004, a Sui coin was discovered dating to the Northern Song dynasty between 1008 and 1016, with the inscription dà zhōng xiáng fú (大中祥符) on one side and the word "wealth" written in Sui script on the other. This is the only known coin produced by the Sui people and established their differing numismatic tradition from the Han Chinese. Several numismatic charms have been attributed to the Sui people from the Sandu Shui Autonomous County, such as a charm depicting male and female dragons (being transformed from fish) with the twelve Chinese zodiacs and the twelve earthly branches written in Sui script on the reverse. Unlike Chinese charms, Sui charms distinguish themselves by depicting male genitalia on the male dragon; this feature seems to be common among male dragons on numismatic charms of neighboring ethnic groups.

== Implied and hidden meanings ==
The implied and hidden meanings of Chinese numismatic talismans (Traditional Chinese: 諧音寓意; Simplified Chinese: 谐音寓意; Pinyin: xié yīn yù yì) refer to the non-obvious meanings ascribed to them. These can take many forms, involving hidden symbolism in their inscriptions as well as visual puns.

One fundamental difference between cash coins and numismatic charms is that most cash coins have four-character inscriptions that usually bear reign names, indicating the period of production and nominal value. While most Chinese numismatic charms also have four character inscriptions, these do not serve for identification but contain wishes and desires such as auspicious inscriptions hoping that good fortune or health will arrive to the carrier, or that they'll succeed in the business world or do well on the imperial examination. Other inscriptions, however, wish for evil and dark spirits or ghosts to go away, or for misfortune to be averted. Unlike cash coins, Chinese numismatic charms depict a wide range of images intended to enhance the charm's symbolism. Charms may also contain visual and spoken puns, the latter of which is facilitated by the nature of the Chinese language, in which many written Hanzi characters have the same pronunciation. (Note: Depending on the local Chinese variety, as the pronunciation of Hanzi characters can differ substantially between them.) The Chinese talismans produced under the reigns of the Ming and Manchu Qing dynasties often used visual and spoken puns. These implied or hidden meanings are referred to in Mandarin Chinese as jí xiáng tú àn (吉祥圖案, "lucky pictures" or a rebus). It is not uncommon for Chinese talismans to depict animals, plants, and other things as substitutes for words due to their similar pronunciations, despite there being no other relationship between them or what the imagery expresses.

=== List of symbols that appear on Chinese numismatic charms and their implied meanings ===
Symbol	Traditional Chinese	Simplified Chinese	Pinyin	Implied or hidden meaning	Origin of the association	Exemplary image(s)
Apple	蘋果	苹果	píng guǒ	Denotes peace	The Mandarin Chinese word for "apple" (蘋果, píng guǒ) sounds similar to that for "peace" (平安, píng ān).	
Apricot grove, Field of apricots	杏	杏	xìng	Successful results in the imperial examination	The first celebration where those who were successful in the imperial examination system was allegedly held in an apricot grove.	
Axe	斧	斧	fǔ	Happiness, power, and punitive actions	The Mandarin Chinese word for "axe" (斧, fǔ) sounds similar to that for "happiness" (福, fú). The head of an axe is considered to be one of the Twelve Ornaments of imperial China. In Buddhism, axes symbolise the destruction of evil. The axe is the symbol of the God of Carpenters, Lu Ban (鲁班).	
Bamboo	竹	竹	zhú	Being upright, resilience, strength, gentleness, being refined, gracefulness.	These are the ideals of Confucian scholars. Bamboo also represents Taoist ideals, as bamboo often bends without breaking.	
Bamboo	竹	竹	zhú	Wishes or congratulations	The Mandarin Chinese word for "bamboo" (竹, zhú) is a homophone of the word for "to congratulate" or "to wish" (祝, zhù).	
Bamboo	竹	竹	zhú	Modesty	Because bamboos have "hollow centers" (空虚, kōng xū), they are associated with "modesty" (謙虛, qiān xū) because the second character in Mandarin Chinese of both words is a homophone.	
Bat	蝠	蝠	fú	Good fortune. When bats are placed upside-down, this means that happiness has arrived. The Five Fortunes: longevity, wealth, health, composure, virtue, and the desire to die a natural death in old age.	The Mandarin Chinese word for "bat" (蝠, fú) sounds like "happiness" (福, fú). The Mandarin Chinese word for "upside-down" (倒, dǎo) sounds like "to have arrived" (到, dào), comparatively when a bat is seen descending from the sky (蝠子天来, fú zi tiān lái) this phrase sounds similar to "good fortune descends from the heaven skies" (福子天来, fú zi tiān lái).	
Bear (Note: Note that bears are very uncommonly used for Chinese numismatic amulets and charms.)	熊	熊	xióng	Heroism (when combined with an eagle)	The Mandarin Chinese word for "Hero" (英雄, yīng xióng) sounds like a composite of "hawk" or "eagle" (鷹, yīng) and "bear" (熊, xióng).	
Bran	麩子	麸子	fū zi	Fertility	The Mandarin Chinese word for "wheat bran" (麩子, fū zi) is a homophone to the term for "wealthy son" (富子, fù zi).	
Butterfly	蝴蝶	蝴蝶	hú dié	Longevity	The second Hanzi character in the Mandarin Chinese word for "butterfly" (蝴蝶, hú dié) sounds the same as the Mandarin Chinese word for "someone who is 70–80 years of age" (耋, dié).	
Calamus	菖蒲	菖蒲	chāng pú	Protection from bad luck, evil spirits, and pathogens	The leaves of a calamus plant resembles swords.	
Carp	鯉	鲤	lǐ	Strength, power, profit, and fertility	The Mandarin Chinese word for "carp" (鯉, lǐ) sounds like that for "strength" (力, lì) and also the word for "profit" (利, lì). Carp are associated with fertility as they lay many eggs.	
Carp	鯉	鲤	lǐ	Persistence	According to an ancient Chinese myth called the lǐ yú tiào lóng mén (鯉魚跳龍門), carps that leap over the dragon gate shall transform into a Chinese dragon.	
Cash coins	錢	钱	qián	Wealth and prosperity, the word "before", completeness	Cash coins are round with a square hole in the middle, which was based on the Ancient Chinese belief that the earth was square and the heavens were circular or round. The Mandarin Chinese word for "coin" (錢, qián) sounds like "before" (前, qián). An archaic Mandarin Chinese term for coins (泉, quán) sounds like the word for "complete" (全, quán).	
Cassia	桂	桂	guì	High ranks through success in the imperial examinations	The Mandarin Chinese word for "cassia" (桂, guì) sounds the same as the word for "high rank" (貴, guì).	
Cat	貓	猫	Māo	Longevity, protection of silkworms	The Mandarin Chinese word for "cat" (貓, māo) is a homophone for "octogenarian" (耄, mào). Cats hunt rats and mice, which are the natural predators of the silkworm.	
Chestnut (Note: The eight-sided holes in some charms, amulets, and coins mostly found in Tang and Song dynasty era are referred to as "chestnut holes" or "flower holes".)	栗子	栗子	Lì zi	Fertility, good manners in a woman	Chestnuts are often given as a Chinese wedding gift. The Mandarin Chinese word meaning "chestnut" (栗子, lì zi) is a homophone to the phrase "producing children" (立子, lì zi). The first Hanzi character in the Mandarin Chinese word meaning "chestnut" (栗, lì) is a homophone to the word for "etiquette" (禮, lǐ); it is associated with that quality in females.	
Chopsticks	筷子	筷子	Kuài zi	The wish for a newlywed couple to immediately start producing male offspring.	The Mandarin Chinese word for "chopsticks" (筷子, kuài zi) is homophonic with the phrase "fast sons" (快子, kuài zi).	
Chime stones (wind chimes)	磬	磬	Qìng	Being wealthy	The Mandarin Chinese word for "chime stone" (磬, qìng) sounds similar to the Mandarin Chinese word for "to congratulate" (慶, qìng). Ancient Chinese chime stones were made from jade and were expensive. The chime stone is one of the Eight Treasures.	
Chrysanthemum	菊	菊	Jú	Maintaining virtue in adverse circumstances, nobility and elegance, longevity	The chrysanthemum is one of the Chinese Four gentlemen. It blooms late in the year when circumstances are less than optimal. The Hanzi character for "chrysanthemum" looks like the Hanzi character for "forever" (永久, yǒng jiǔ). (Note: Similarly, the Hanzi character for chrysanthemum also represents the number "nine" (九) because they look similar.)	
Cicada	蟬	蝉	Chán	Immortality and rebirth.	Cicadas survive underground for a significant period before they rise and fly towards the skies.	
Buddha's hand (Citrus medica var. sarcodactylis) (Note: The fingered citron is also known as "Buddha's Hand".)	佛手	佛手	Fó shǒu	Happiness and longevity	The Mandarin Chinese word for "Buddha's hand" (佛手, fó shǒu) sounds similar to the Mandarin Chinese words for "happiness" (福, fú) and longevity" (壽, shòu).	
Clouds (Note: In the world of Chinese charms, amulets, and talismans clouds are sometimes referred to as "auspicious clouds" (祥雲, xiáng yún).)	雲	云	yún	Heaven, good luck	The Mandarin Chinese word for "cloud" (雲, yún) has a similar pronunciation as that for "luck" (運, yùn).	
Coral	珊瑚	珊瑚	shān hú	Longevity, promotions in rank	Coral was historically thought to be an underwater "iron tree" (鐵樹, tiě shù) that blossomed once per century. Red coral is believed to be auspicious for its colour. Coral buttons were worn on the hats of government officials. Coral resembles deer antlers, and deer are associated with longevity. Coral is considered to be one of the Eight Treasures.	
Crab	蟹	蟹	xiè	Peace and harmony, high rank	The Mandarin Chinese term for "crab" (蟹, xiè) sounds similar to the word for "harmony" (协, xié). The Mandarin Chinese term for "crab's shell" (甲, jiǎ) also means "first", as in the person who has the highest score on the imperial examination system.	
Crane	鶴	鹤	hè	Longevity, success in the imperial exam, and high rank, harmonious marriage	It was historically believed that cranes reach high ages before death. Images of cranes were embroidered on the clothing of high-rank government officials. The Mandarin Chinese word for "crane" (鶴, hè) sounds similar to the Mandarin Chinese word for "harmony" (合, hé). See also: Crane in Chinese mythology.	
Cypress	柏	柏	bǎi	Large quantities	The Mandarin Chinese word for "cypress" (柏, bǎi) sounds similar to the Mandarin Chinese word for "one-hundred" (百, bǎi).	
Date fruits	棗	枣	Zǎo	An imminent turn of events, the conception of children	The Mandarin Chinese word for "a Chinese jujube" or "date" (棗, zǎo) sounds like the words for "soon" and "early" (早, zǎo).	
Deer (Note: Deer are one of the most commonly seen animals on Chinese numismatic charms, amulets, and talismans.)	鹿	鹿	Lù	A high government salary, prosperity, longevity	The Mandarin Chinese word for "deer" (鹿, lù) sounds like the Mandarin Chinese word for the salary of a government official (祿, lù). The Mandarin Chinese word for "deer" sounds like the name of the Chinese God of Prosperity. Traditionally, the Chinese people thought that deer could find the magical lingzhi fungus of immortality.	
Dog	犬	犬	Quǎn	The Chinese zodiac "dog".	Dogs are one of the twelve Chinese zodiacs.	
Door guardians (Shentu and Yulü)	門神	门神	ménshén	Protection against bad luck and evil spirits	The door gods were warriors who fought evil.	
Dragon	龍	龙	Lóng	Longevity, the renewal of life, fertility, prosperity, and benevolence; good harvests; the Emperor; (Note: When a dragon has five fingers it represents an Emperor, a dragon with only four fingers represents a King.) the east and the spring; a human male. (Note: When a Chinese dragon is conjoined with a Chinese phoenix they symbolise a married couple.)	Dragons were believed to bring rain and were associated with good harvests. The Chinese dragon is associated with yang (the orient, springtime, and "male energy").	
Dragonfly	蜻蜓	蜻蜓	Qīng tíng	Pureness of character	The first character in the Mandarin Chinese word for "dragonfly" (蜻, qīng) sounds like the Mandarin Chinese word for "pure" (清, qīng).	
Duck	鴛鴦 / 鸂	鸳鸯 / 鸂	Yuān yāng / Xī	Peace and prosperity in marriage, conjugal affection and fidelity.	The ancient Chinese people believed that Mandarin ducks mated for life. See also: Wedding ducks	
Dumplings	餃子	饺子	Jiǎo zi	Abundance, money, wealth, fertility and large families	Dumplings are often shaped like crescents which symbolise the desire to have "a year of abundance" or like silver sycees which symbolise wealth. The Mandarin Chinese name for "dumplings" (餃子, jiǎo zi) sounds similar to that of the jiaozi banknotes (交子, jiāozǐ). It was customary to place cash coins in dumplings with the wish that the person who found them would be granted prosperity. The characters that compose the Mandarin Chinese characters for "dumplings" sound like "to have sexual intercourse" (交, jiāo) and "child" (子, zǐ).	
Eagle (or Hawk)	鷹	鹰	Yīng	Heroism	See: Bear	
Egret (Heron)	鷺	鹭	Lù	Pathways, wealth, longevity, purity, and good fortune	The Mandarin Chinese word for a "Heron" or an "Egret" (鷺, lù) sounds similar to the Mandarin Chinese term for "path", "road", or "way" (路, lù). The word also has a similar pronunciation to the term for "an official's salary" (祿, lù).	
Eight (the number)	八	八	Bā	Good fortune	The number eight is pronounced in Chinese languages (particularly in the Southern variants) similarly to the words for "wealth" or "to prosper" (發財, fā cái).	
Eight immortals	八仙	八仙	Bā xiān	Varies depending on the member(s) depicted	The eight immortals refers to eight individuals who practiced Taoism and were believed to have attained immortality.	
Eight Treasures (Chinese) (Note: "Eight Precious Things" and the "Eight Auspicious Treasures".)	八寶	八宝	Bā bǎo	1. The wish-granting pearl (寳珠, bǎozhū) or flaming pearl 2. The double lozenges (方勝, "fāngshèng").; 3. The stone chime (磬, "qìng").; 4. The pair of rhinoceros horns (犀角, xījiǎo).; 5. The double coins (雙錢, shuāngqián).; 6. The gold or silver ingot (錠, dìng).; 7. Coral (珊瑚, shānhú).; 8. The wish-granting scepter (如意, rúyì).	These are the traditional Eight Treasures from China, but they can also be considered to be a subset of the Hundred Treasures.	
Eight Treasures (Buddhist) (Note: Also in Hinduism and Jainism.)	佛門八寶	佛门八宝	Fó mén bā bǎo	1. The lotus flower symbolises purity and enlightenment.; 2. The Wheel of the Dharma symbolises knowledge.; 3. The treasure vase symbolises wealth.; 4. The conch shell holds the Buddha's thoughts.; 5. The victory banner represents that the Buddha's teachings conquer all.; 6. The endless knot symbolises harmony.; 7. The parasol symbolises protection.; 8. A pair of fish symbolises happiness in marriage.	The eight treasures in Buddhism are the precious organs of the Buddha's body.	
Elephant	象	象	Xiàng	Good fortune; peace and good luck (when depicted with a vase on its back)	The Mandarin Chinese word for "elephant" (象, xiàng) sounds similar to the Mandarin Chinese word for "lucky" or "auspicious" (祥, xiáng). The Mandarin Chinese word for "vase" (瓶, píng) has the same pronunciation as the first component for the Mandarin Chinese word for "peace" (平安, píng ān).	
Fenghuang (Chinese phoenix)	鳳凰	凤凰	Fènghuáng	Joy and peace, happy marriage (when shown with a dragon), the South and summer, the Empress of China	Fenghuang were believed to only appear in peaceful and prosperous times. The fenghuang (Chinese phoenix) represents yin (female) while the dragon represents yang (male).	
Fish	魚	鱼	Yú	Abundance, "more" (of whatever is represented by a symbol paired with it), fertility, happiness in marriage (paired fish).	The Mandarin Chinese word for "fish" (魚, yú) sounds like the Mandarin Chinese word for "surplus" or "abundance" (余, yú). Because fish lay many eggs at the same time, they are associated with fertility, and thus a happy marriage. See also: Fish in Chinese mythology and Carp on this list.	
Five blessings (Note: Alternatively known as the "Five Happinesses" or "Five Good Fortunes".)	五福	五福	Wǔ fú	1. Longevity (壽); 2. Wealth (富); 3. Health and composure (康寧); 4. Virtue (修好德); 5. The desire to die a natural death in old age (考終命).	These are the Chinese five blessings described in the Book of Documents.	
Five blessings	五福	五福	Wǔ fú	1. Good fortune (福); 2. The salary of a government official (祿); 3. Longevity (壽); 4. Joy or happiness (喜); 5. (Earthly) valuables or property (財).	These are a popular "alternative five blessings" in China.	
Five Poisons (Note: The five poisons are alternatively referred to as the "Five Poisonous Creatures"; this term refers to five poisonous creatures, usually including snakes, scorpions, centipedes, toads, and spiders. In some variations, lizards replace spiders. The "three-legged toad" is often seen as one of the five poisons.)	五毒	五毒	Wǔ dú	The ability to counteract the pernicious influences of toxins.	The ancient Chinese believed that one could combat poison with poison.	
Fly-whisk	拂塵	拂尘	Fú chén	Enlightenment	These fly-swatting tools symbolically represent the sweeping away of ignorance.	
Four Blessings	四福	四福	Sì fú	1. Happiness (喜).; 2. The salary of a high government official (祿).; 3. Longevity (壽).; 4. Good luck or good fortune (福).		
Four Divine Creatures (Note: They are alternatively known as the Four Heraldic Animals, the Four Directional Animals, or the Four Symbols (四象).)	四象	四象	Sì Xiàng	The Vermillion Bird (朱雀, zhū què) which represents the south and symbolizes the summer. The White tiger (白虎, bái hǔ) represents the west and symbolizes the autumn. The Azure Dragon (青龍, qīng lóng) represents the east and symbolizes the spring. The black tortoise (or black warrior) coiled around by a snake (玄武, xuán wǔ) represents the north and symbolizes winter.	Each animal symbolizes a direction and has a season associated with that direction.	
Four Gentlemen (Note: They are alternatively known as the Four Plants of Virtue.)	四君子	四君子	Sì jūn zǐ	1. Orchid (springtime); 2. Bamboo (summer); 3. Chrysanthemum (autumn); 4. Plum (winter) (Note: Images of bamboo and a plum together symbolise friendship.)	Each member of the Four Gentlemen represents a season.	
Four Happiness Boys	四蝠男子	四蝠男子	Sì fú nán zǐ	Good luck, many male offspring	The "Four Happiness Boys" depicts two boys in a way that looks as if there are four. This illusion creates the hope for frequent male progeny.	
Four Happinesses	四蝠	四蝠	Sì fú	1. "Sweet rain after a long drought" (久旱逢甘雨, jiǔ hàn féng gān yǔ); 2. "Meeting an old friend in a faraway place" (他鄉遇故知, tā xiāng yù gù zhī); 3. "The wedding night" (洞房花燭夜, dòng fáng huā zhú yè); 4. "Having one's name on the list of successful candidates of the imperial examination" (金榜題名時, jīn bǎng tí míng shí)	"The four happinesses" come from a Song dynasty era poem composed by Hong Mai (洪邁).	
Frog	蛙	蛙	Wā	Fertility	The Mandarin Chinese word for "frog" (蛙, wā) has a similar pronunciation as the Mandarin Chinese word for "baby" (娃, wá).	
Fu Lu Shou	福祿壽	福禄寿	Fú Lù Shòu	Happiness, prosperity, and longevity	Fu Lu Shou refers to the three gods who embody these concepts.	
Fungus of immortality (Note: Alternatively known as the glossy ganoderma.)	靈芝	灵芝	Líng zhī	Longevity	The lingzhi mushroom doesn't decay in the same manner as other fungi, instead becoming woody and surviving for an extended period of time. It is also believed to grow on the "Three Islands of the Immortals".	
Goat	羊	羊	Yáng	Blessings and protection from famine	A reference to a story in which five goat-riding immortals came down from the heavens and fed a city during a famine; the goats remained and turned to stone. (Note: Due to this myth the city of Guangzhou has also adopted the nicknames "the City of Goats" (羊城), "Sheaves of Rice City" (穗城), and "the City of Five Goats" (五羊城).)	
God of Examinations (Note: Alternatively referred to in English the Star of Literature.)	魁星	魁星	Kuí xīng	Success in the imperial exams	The God of Examinations is often thought to help candidates pass the difficult and rigorous Chinese civil exams of the imperial examination system.	
God of Happiness (Note: He is alternatively known as the "God of Luck" or the "God of Good Fortune and Blessings".)	福 / 福神 / 福星	福 / 福神 / 福星	Fú / Fú shén / Fú xīng	Good luck and good fortune	The God of Happiness is a continuation of one of Taoism's three original gods or heavenly officials, namely the "Heavenly Official who grants fortune" (天官賜福).	
God of Longevity (Note: The Chinese God of Longevity is alternatively known as "Shou Lao" (壽老), the "Old Immortal of the South Pole" (南極仙翁), and the "Longevity Star" (壽星).)	壽	寿	Shòu	Longevity, wisdom	In Confucianism, it is believed that wisdom comes with (old) age.	
God of Prosperity (Note: He is alternatively known as "the God of Rank and Emolument", and "the God of High Ranking Office".)	祿	禄	Lù	Prosperity, wishes fulfilled, high rank and salary	The God of Prosperity is associated with the saying "may office and salary be bestowed upon you" (加官進祿).	
Leigong (god of thunder)	雷神 / 雷公	雷神 / 雷公	Léi shén / Léi gōng	Punishment of criminals and evil spirits	Leigong is usually featured on Taoist numismatic charms in the form of the inscription "O Thunder God, destroy devils, subdue bogies, and drive away evil influences. Receive this command of Tai Shang Lao Qun (Lao Zi) and execute it as fast as Lü Ling [a famous runner of the Zhou dynasty{{]}}" (Traditional Chinese: 雷霆八部，誅鬼降精，斬妖辟邪，永保神清，奉太上老君，急急如律令，敕。; Hanyu Pinyin: Léi Tíng bā bù, zhū guǐ jiàng jīng, zhǎn yāo pì xié, yǒng bǎo shén qīng, fèng tài Shàng Lǎo Jūn, jí jí rú Lǜ Lìng, chì.).	
God of War	關帝 關公	关帝 关公	Guān Dì; Guān Gōng	Warding off evil	Guan Yu is an immortalized Chinese general who is often depicted wielding a huge broadsword used to fight evil.	
God of Wealth	財神	财神	Cái shén	Wealth and success	Caishen is usually depicted either carrying or being surrounded by cash coins, sycees, coral and other symbols the ancient Chinese associated with wealth.	
Gods of Peace and Harmony (Note: They are alternatively known as "the Gods of Unity and Harmony", "the Laughing Twins", and "the Gods of Mirth" in the English language.)	和合二仙	和合二仙	Hé hé èr xiān	Peace and harmony	Han Shan (寒山) is usually depicted holding a round container, the Ruyi sceptre, a calabash, cash coins, a persimmon, etc. While the other twin, Shi De (拾得), is usually depicted holding a lotus flower.	
Goldfish	金魚	金鱼	Jīn yú	Abundance of wealth	The first character in the Mandarin Chinese name for "goldfish" means "gold" (金, jīn), while second character means "fish" which has a similar pronunciation as the Mandarin Chinese words for "jade" (玉, yù) and for "abundance" or "surplus" (余, yú).	
Gourd	葫蘆	葫芦	Hú lu	Protection, blessings, success at imperial exams, fertility, having male progeny	The first Hanzi symbol in the Mandarin Chinese term for "gourd" (葫蘆, hú lu) is homonymous to the Mandarin Chinese term for "to protect" or "to guard" (護, hù). It also sounds like the Mandarin Chinese term for "blessing" (祜, hù). In some varieties of the Chinese languages, the word for "gourd" (葫蘆) sounds like the terms for "happiness and rank" (福祿). Trailing vines of calabashes are named in Mandarin Chinese with the Hanzi character "蔓", which can also be a homonym to the Mandarin Chinese word for "ten thousand" (萬, wàn); because the calabash contains many seeds, they are associated with fertility.	
Grasshopper (Tettigoniidae)	螽斯	螽斯	Zhōng sī	Fertility and procreation	Grasshoppers are associated with fertility because they gather together and reproduce in large numbers. One charm has the inscription "may your children be as numerous as grasshoppers" (螽斯衍慶, zhōng sī yǎn qìng).	
Ji (halberd)	戟	戟	Jǐ	Good luck, success in exams	The Mandarin Chinese word for "halberd" (戟, jǐ) sounds like the Mandarin Chinese term for "lucky" or "auspicious" (吉, jí); it also sounds like the term for "rank" or "grade" (級, jí), which in this context refers to the rank of a government official.	
Horse	馬	马	Mǎ	Strength, stamina, perseverance, speed, Mongols	Horses are associated with the Mongol people who ruled the Yuan dynasty. Horses are also represented on the Chinese zodiac. See also: Horse in Chinese mythology.	
Horse saddle	鞍	鞍	Ān	Peace	The Mandarin Chinese word for "saddle" (鞍, ān) sounds like the Mandarin Chinese word for "peace" (安, ān).	
Kitchen God	灶君	灶君	Zào Jūn	Protection of the hearth and family	The Kitchen God is the most important of a plethora of domestic gods in Chinese folk religion, mythology, and Taoism.	
Lion	獅	狮	Shī	Majesty, strength, high rank, wealth, Gautama Buddha	The Mandarin Chinese word for "lion" (獅, shī) sounds like the word for "teacher", "master", "tutor", or "preceptor" (師, shī) which could be associated with archaic governmental titles such as "Senior Grand Tutor" (太師, tài shī) and "Junior Preceptor" (少師, shào shī). An ancient legend states that great fortune will be bestowed on a household if a lion enters its gates. Lions are depicted as the guardians of Buddhism and a symbol of Buddhist kings. Gautama Buddha is believed to have been reincarnated ten times as a lion. See also: Cultural depictions of lions.	
Liu Haichan and Jin Chan	劉海戲蟾	刘海戏蟾	Liú hǎi xì chán	Wealth and prosperity	See Chinese numismatic charm § Liu Haichan and the Three-Legged Toad charms above.	
Longevity stone	長壽石	长寿石	Cháng shòu shí	Longevity	Longevity stones are odd-shaped rocks associated with longevity because they are old. They are usually depicted next to images of linzhi mushrooms.	
Lotus	蓮花 / 荷花	莲花 / 荷花	Lián huā / Hé huā	Purity, detachment from earthly concerns, continuous harmony, harmony in sex and marriage, continuous childbirth (for seeds)	Gautama Buddha is often shown sitting on a lotus. One of the Mandarin Chinese words for "lotus" is lián huā (蓮花) which has a primary Hanzi character that is pronounced similar to the Mandarin Chinese word for "continuous" (連, lián), while the first Hanzi character in another term for "lotus" is pronounced as hé (荷) which sounds similar to the Mandarin Chinese word for "harmony" (和, hé). When a lotus pod is depicted on the same charm as a lotus stem, this symbolises harmonious marriage and sexual intercourse. The Mandarin Chinese word for "lotus seeds" (蓮籽, lián zǐ) sounds like the Mandarin Chinese phrase "continuously giving birth to children" (連子, lián zi).	
Lozenge	方勝	方胜	Fāng shèng	Good luck, a musical instrument (with two interlocked lozenges), people in cooperation, victory	The lozenge is one of the Eight Treasures, though it is unclear why lozenges are associated with good luck. Interlocked lozenges symbolise an ancient Chinese musical instrument due to their diamond shape. This can also symbolise two hearts working together with a single mindset.	
Magpie	喜鵲	喜鹊	Xǐ què	Happiness, (Note: If a magpie is shown upside down, this has the same connotations as an upside-down bat described above. The same goes for two magpies, as in "a pair of magpies" (喜喜), or two bats, as in "a pair of bats" (蝠蝠).) marriage (in pairs)	The first character in the Mandarin Chinese word for "magpie" (喜鵲, xǐ què) is synonymous with the Mandarin Chinese word for "happiness" (喜). The association with marriage comes from an old Chinese tale of two celestial lovers who could only meet once a year on a bridge made of magpies. (Note: Some of these Chinese sayings include "there is a happy bird (magpie) on the tip of the plum branch" (喜上梅稍, xǐ shàng méi shāo) which has a homonymous sound to the other Chinese saying "happiness up to one's eyebrows" (喜上眉稍, xǐ shàng méi shāo).)	
Mirror	銅鏡	铜镜	Tóng jìng	Good luck, protection from demons and evil spirits, harmonious marriage (when depicted with shoes)	The (bronze) mirror is one of the Eight Treasures. The ancient Chinese believed that a demon or evil spirit would be scared of their reflection in a mirror and flee. The Mandarin Chinese words for "bronze mirror" (銅鏡, tóng jìng) and "shoes" (鞋, xié) sound like "together and in harmony" (同諧, tóng xié).	
Money tree	搖錢樹	摇钱树	Yáo qián shù	Wealth, riches, and treasures.	See Chinese numismatic charm § Chinese money trees	
Monkey	猴	猴	Hóu	The monkey is one of the 12 animals of the Chinese zodiac. The Monkey King	The Monkey King or "Sun Wukong" (孫悟空) Is a character from the Ming dynasty era novel Journey to the West. See: Monkeys in Chinese culture.	
Monkey riding a horse (Note: Sometimes a monkey is shown riding a deer.)	馬上風猴	马上风猴	Mǎ shàng fēng hóu	A wish to be immediately promoted to high rank	The first Hanzi characters of the Mandarin Chinese phrase mǎ shàng fēng hóu (馬上風猴) could mean both "on the horse" as well as "at once". The word for "wind" or "breeze" is pronounced similarly to the word for "to grant a title" (封, fēng). The final Hanzi character means "monkey" and is pronounced like the word for "marquis" (侯, hóu), which denotes a high rank.	
Moon (crescent)	月	月	Yuè		In Chinese mythology, the moon is the residence of Jin Chan. In Taoist mythology, the "Jade Rabbit" (a.k.a. the "Moon Hare") lives on the moon, and is known for making the elixir of immortality. The moon is often a location for various figures from Chinese mythology.	
Mountain	山	山	Shān	Limitlessness	In Chinese mythology, mountains are the places closest to the Gods.	
Mugwort (Artemisia leaf)	艾	艾	Ài	Longevity, protection from harm	The mugwort is associated with longevity because of its usage in traditional Chinese medicine and as one of the Eight Treasures. People used to hang mugwort on their doors in the belief that the scent would repel insects and that the tiger-claw shape would offer protection.	
Narcissus	水仙	水仙	Shuǐ xiān	Immortals	The Mandarin Chinese word for "narcissus" (水仙, shuǐ xiān) means "water immortal".	
Nine (number)	九	九	Jiǔ	Forever	The Mandarin Chinese word for the number "nine" (九, jiǔ) is homonymous with the Mandarin Chinese word for "forever" or "long lasting" (久, jiǔ).	
Nine similitudes	九如	九如	Jiǔ rú	The nine similitudes are associated with the congratulatory greeting: "May you be as the mountains and the hills, as the greater (taller) and the lesser (shorter) heights, as the river streams which flow in all directions, having the constancy of the moon in the sky, like the rising sun which brings us the day, with the longevity of the southern mountain and the green luxuriance of the fir and the cypress." which wishes for the greeted person to be blessed with luxury, wealth, and (of course) longevity.	The nine similitudes are from the Classic of Poetry which is a book that incorporates music, poetry, and hymns from the Spring and Autumn period and the Zhou dynasty.	
Onion	蔥	葱	Cōng	Intelligence, wit	The Mandarin Chinese word for "onion" (蔥, cōng) sounds like the word for "clever" or "intelligent" (聰明, cōng míng).	
Orange tree	桔	桔	Jú	Good luck, good fortune	The Hanzi character for orange is "桔", which contains the Hanzi characters "木" ("tree") and "吉" ("lucky" or "auspicious").	
Orchid	蘭	兰	Lán	Humility, modesty, beauty and refinement; female beauty.	The orchid is a member of the Four Gentlemen.	
Osmanthus (Chinese cinnamon)	桂	桂	Guì	Preciousness, honour, longevity	The Mandarin Chinese word for an "osmanthus blossom" (桂, guì) sounds similar to the term for "something that is precious" or "something that is of value" (貴, guì). The scent of the Osmanthus fragrans is associated with fragrance (or an "honourable life").	
Ox (water buffalo)	牛	牛	Niú	Harvest, fertility, springtime; a simple and idyllic life; great fortune from humble beginnings (with a boy riding)	The ox is one of the twelve animals represented on the Chinese zodiac. Oxen were important to agricultural development and are associated with harvests, fertility, and the springtime. A boy or young man riding an ox may represent Zhu Yuanzhang, who went from humble beginnings to found the Ming dynasty.	
Peach	桃	桃	Táo	Marriage, springtime, longevity, justice, Taoist immortality, weaponry, protection from demons	Peaches are associated with longevity because of the peaches of immortality. Peach wood was used to make weapons (and amulets). The Mandarin Chinese word for "peach" (桃, táo) sounds like the Mandarin Chinese term for "to flee", "to retreat", or "to run away" (逃, táo). The ancient Chinese people believed that the timber of peach trees could keep demons away because the Mandarin Chinese word for "peach" sounds like the Mandarin Chinese word for "to eliminate" (淘, táo). The peach is a member of the Chinese "three plenties".	
Peacock	孔雀	孔雀	Kǒng què	Desire for prosperity and peace; dignity paired with beauty; high rank	The Queen Mother of the West is sometimes depicted riding a peacock. The ancient Chinese people believed that a single glance of a peacock would instantly make a woman pregnant. During the Ming and Qing dynasties, the seniority of an official could be deduced by the number of peacock feathers they wore on their hats.	
Peanut	花生	花生	Huā shēng	Fertility	The second Hanzi character in the Mandarin Chinese word for "peanut" is "生", which is synonymous with the term "to give birth".	
Pearl	寳珠	宝珠	Bǎozhū	Endless transformation; perfection and enlightenment (when chased by a dragon); (Note: This is even more so the case if the dragon in this context represents the Emperor of China.) wealth, treasure, pure intentions, and genius in obscurity	Chinese dragons are often depicted as chasing a pearl-like jewel object. The pearl also resembles the moon, and as a dragon devours or disgorges the moon, it appears to wane or wax. The flaming pearl is one of the Eight Treasures.	
Peony	牡丹 富貴花	牡丹 富贵花	Mǔ dān Fù guì huā	Longevity, happiness, eternal beauty, and loyalty. Economic prosperity and wealth.	The double manner in which peonies grow resembles strings of Chinese cash coins, which is why they're associated with richness. This is also the origin of the alternative Mandarin Chinese name for the peony "fù guì huā" (富貴花).	
Peony in a vase	牡丹花瓶	牡丹花瓶	Mǔ dān huā píng	Wealth and prosperity in peace	The Mandarin Chinese word for "peony" (牡丹, mǔ dān) can be translated as "the flower of wealth and honour", while the Mandarin Chinese word for "vase" (瓶, píng) is a homophonic pun with "peace" (平安, píng ān).	
Persimmon	柿	柿	Shì	Good luck; official matters; a gentleman or official; safe concerns (when paired with an apple)	The persimmon is considered to be an auspicious symbol due to its orange colour and round shape. The Mandarin Chinese word for "persimmon" (柿, shì) sounds like the word for "matters, affairs or events" (事, shì). It also sounds like the word for "official" or "gentleman" (仕, shì). The Mandarin Chinese word for "apple" (蘋果, píng guǒ) sounds like the Mandarin Chinese word for "safety" (平安, píng ān) forming a visual pun that symbolises the saying "may your matters be safe" (事平安, shì píng ān).	
Pig, boar or hog	豬	猪	Zhū	Economic prosperity, good luck, protection from evil spirits	The pig is a sign of the Chinese zodiac. Pigs are associated with protection from evil due to an ancient Chinese tradition where parents had their sons wear pig-themed shoes and hats to supposedly fool evil spirits into thinking that the boy was a pig, and thus leave him alone.	
Pine tree	松	松	Sōng	Longevity, solitude, protection of the dead	The pine tree is one of the Chinese Three Friends of Winter. Because they can endure very rough winter weather, pine trees are associated with longevity. Ancient Chinese people believed that a creature named Wang Xiang (罔象) devoured the brains of dead people but was afraid of pine trees, so pines were often planted near graveyards.	
Plum	梅	梅	Méi	Hopefulness and courageousness; the Chinese five blessings (plum blossom petals)	The plum is one of the Chinese Three Friends of Winter. The ancient Chinese associated plums with courage since plums blossom first while winter still poses a threat to their fruits, which is considered to be brave.	
Pomegranate	石榴	石榴	Shí liu	Fertility	The association with fertility has two major reasons: pomegranates have many seeds, and the first Hanzi character of "pomegranate" (石榴, shí liu) sounds like the Mandarin Chinese term for "generations" (世, shì) as in "generations of descendants". The pomegranate is a member of the Chinese "three plenties".	
Prawn (Note: Known as "shrimp" in American English.)	蝦	虾	Xiā	Happiness and laughter	The Chinese character for "prawn" (蝦) is pronounced as xiā in Mandarin Chinese and haa in Yuè Chinese (Cantonese) which are both very similar to the sound people make when they laugh (ha ha ha).	
Pumpkin	南瓜	南瓜	Nán guā	A desire to produce male offspring	The first Hanzi character of the word for "pumpkin" (南, nán; meaning south) sounds like the Mandarin Chinese word for "boy" or "male" (男, nán).	
Qilin ("Chinese unicorn")	麒麟	麒麟	Qílín	Benevolence, goodwill, good fortune, and prosperity; the west and autumn.	The Qilin was believed by ancient Chinese people to appear whenever a new sage was born. Qilin are often depicted delivering babies on Chinese numismatic charms.	
Quail	鵪鶉	鹌鹑	Ān chún	Courage, peace	The quail is associated with courage due to its combative attitude. The first Hanzi character in the Mandarin Chinese word for "quail" (鵪鶉, ān chún) can be used in a homophonic pun for "peace" (安, ān).	
Rabbit	兔子	兔子	Tù zi	Longevity	In Taoist mythology, the elixir of immortality is prepared by the "moon hare", who resides on the moon. The rabbit (or hare) is one of the twelve Chinese zodiac animals.	
Rat	老鼠 大鼠	老鼠 大鼠	Lǎo shǔ Dà shǔ	Abundance, fertility, wealth	The rat is associated with fertility due to its strong reproductive capabilities. The rat is one of the twelve animals of the Chinese zodiac.	
Reed pipe	笙	笙	Shēng	Giving birth, promotion	The Mandarin Chinese word for "reed pipe" (笙, shēng) sounds similar to the word meaning "to give birth" (生, shēng). It also sounds similar to the Mandarin Chinese word, which could be translated as "to rise" (升, shēng).	
Rhinoceros horns	犀角	犀角	Xī jiǎo	Happiness	Rhinoceros horns are one of the Eight Treasures. The first Hanzi character in the Mandarin Chinese word for "rhinoceros horn" (犀角, xī jiǎo) sounds like the Mandarin Chinese word for "happiness" (喜, xǐ).	
Ribbons and fillets	帶	带	Dài	Greatness and vastness; descendants who enjoy longevity	Ribbons were believed to enhance the characteristics and importance of the object they were bound to. The Mandarin Chinese word for "ribbon" or "fillet" (帶, dài) sounds like the Mandarin Chinese word for "generations" (代, dài); as the Mandarin Chinese word for a fillet attached to an official seal is (綬帶, shòu dài), the first Hanzi character of this term could also be associated with a long life because it sounds like the word for "longevity" (壽, shòu). In combination, this means that future generations shall enjoy longevity. The red colour of these ribbons is associated with joy and happiness. The Mandarin Chinese word for "red" (紅, hóng) sounds like the words for "vast" (洪, hóng) and "great" (宏, hóng).	
Ritual baton	笏	笏	Hù	High rank	These batons, depicted as an X-shaped symbol, are thought to be based on narrow tablets known as hù (笏), which were carried by Chinese officials as authorisation passes. Wooden clappers were also associated with one of the eighth immortals, Cao Guojiu (曹國舅).	
Rooster	公雞	公鸡	Gōng jī	Good luck; high rank; intelligence and fame; the five virtues (五德)	The second Hanzi character in the Mandarin Chinese word for "cock" (公雞, gōng jī) sounds like the Mandarin Chinese word for "auspicious" or "lucky" (吉, jí). Cocks symbolize a high rank because their combs look like the hat of a Mandarin. The Mandarin Chinese term for a "crowing cock" (公鳴, gōng míng) sounds like the term for "intelligence and fame" (功名, gōng míng). Cocks symbolises the five virtues because its comb makes it resemble a Mandarin (civil); its spurs (martial); how the cock conducts itself during combat (courage); cocks protect their hens (kindness), and cocks are very accurate in heralding the dawn. The rooster is one of the twelve animals of the Chinese zodiac.	
Ruyi scepter	如意	如意	Rúyì	Power and authority; good wishes and prosperity	In Buddhism and Chinese mythology, the Ruyi scepter can grant wishes. The Ruyi scepter is one of the Eight Treasures.	
Sanxing	三星 / 福祿壽	三星 / 福禄寿	Sān xīng / Fú Lù Shòu	Prosperity, high rank, and longevity	The "three stars" are the Gods of Prosperity (Fu), Status (Lu), and Longevity (Shou) in Chinese religion.	
Sheep (Note: Could also be represented as a goat or ram.)	羊	羊	Yáng	Yang energy, the sun, filial piety	The Mandarin Chinese word for "sheep", "ram", and "goat" (羊, yáng) sounds like the word for "Yang energy" (陽, yáng) which could also mean "the sun". Lambs kneel when they receive milk from their mothers, which is seen as submissiveness in Confucianism.	
Shoes	鞋	鞋	Xié	Wealth; in harmony with (when paired with another symbol); fertility and a wish to produce offspring (for lotus shoes)	Shoes are associated with wealth because they are shaped similarly to sycees. The Mandarin Chinese word for "shoes" (鞋, xié) sounds like the words for "together with" (諧, xié) and "in harmony with" (諧, xié). The Mandarin Chinese word for "lotus flower" (蓮, lián) sounds like the word for "continuous" (連, lián).	
Six (6)	六 / 陸	六 / 陆	Liù	A wish for things to go smoothly; good fortune, good luck, and prosperity	The Mandarin Chinese word for the number "six" (六, liù) sounds like the word for "to flow" (流, liú). The saying "everything goes smoothly with six" (六六大顺, liù liù dà shùn) is based on this. The Mandarin Chinese word for "six" also sounds like the word for "prosperity" (祿, lù).	
Snake	蛇	蛇	Shé		The snake is one of the twelve animals represented as a Chinese zodiac. The snake is also a member of the Five Poisons. See also: Snakes in Chinese mythology and Chinese numismatic charm § "Five poisons" talismans.	
Spider	蜘蛛 / 蟲喜子	蜘蛛 / 虫喜子	Zhī zhū / Chóng xǐ zǐ	Happiness or happy sons; happiness falling from the sky (if depicted falling)	The first Hanzi character from one of the Mandarin Chinese terms for "spider" (喜子, xǐ zǐ) means "happiness", the second Hanzi character can also mean "son".	
Star (dots)	星	星	Xīng	Unknown	Unknown	
Stork	鸛	鹳	Guàn	Longevity, promotion and high rank	The ancient Chinese believed that storks lived a thousand years; storks are often depicted next to pine trees, which are another longevity symbol. In Chinese folk religion, both the Queen Mother of the West and Shouxing, the God of Longevity, ride storks as their mode of transportation. The Mandarin Chinese word for "stork" (鸛, guàn) is a homophonic pun with the Mandarin Chinese words for "government official" (官, guān), "first place" (冠, guàn), and "hat" (冠, guàn); it is thus associated with promotion and high rank in government.	
Swallow	燕	燕	Yàn	Good fortune, the spring, and bringing prosperous change	Swallows were seen as bringing "new" to "old" because they arguably "renovate" areas by constructing their mud nests in the cracks of walls and graves.	
Swastika	卐 卍	卐 卍	Wàn	"The myriad of things" or "everything"	The swastika Hanzi character is pronounced as wàn (卐 / 卍) which sounds like the Mandarin Chinese word for "ten thousand" (萬, wàn).	
Sword	刀	刀	Dāo	Victory over evil (if used as a symbol for Lu Dongbin), protection against evil spirits and bogies (if used as a symbol for Zhong Kui)	See Chinese numismatic charm § Chinese talismans with sword symbolism.	
Sycee (Note: Sycees are alternatively known as "saddle sycees", "silver sycees", and "drum-shaped sycees".)	細絲 / 元寶	细丝 / 元宝	Xì sī / Yuán bǎo	Wealth, high rank, brightness and purity	Silver became an official measurement of wealth during the Mongol Yuan dynasty, and sycees became closely associated with wealth. The first Hanzi character in the Mandarin Chinese word for sycees "yuanbao" (元寶, yuánbǎo) also means "first" which could be interpreted as being "first place in the imperial exams" and thus attaining a high rank. Sycees are a member of the Eight Treasures.	
Taijitu (yin and yang symbol) (Note: Also known as the "supreme ultimate symbol".)	太極圖	太极图	Tàijítú	The light and the dark, the strong and the weak, the male and the female, Etc.	The taijitu is a Taoist symbol that represents the fundamental polarities of the universe.	
Teapot (or pot)	壺	壶	Hú	Protection, blessings	The Mandarin Chinese word for "teapot" or simply "pot" (壺, hú) sounds like the words for "blessing" (祜, hù) and "to protect" (護, hù).	
Ten Symbols of Longevity (Note: The "Ten Symbols of Longevity" are alternatively known as the "Ten Longevities" (十壽) in Chinese mythology.)	十壽	十寿	Shí shòu	1. The pine tree (松); 2. The sun (日); 3. The crane (鹤); 4. Water (水); 5. The mountains (山); 6. The clouds (雲); 7. The deer (鹿); 8. The tortoise (龜); 9. The Lingzhi mushroom (靈芝); 10. Bamboo (竹).	The Ten Symbols of Longevity are symbols that the ancient Chinese people associated with longevity, and are also very prominent in Korean art, including Korean numismatic charms.	
Three Abundances (Note: They are alternatively known as "the Three Plenties".)	三多	三多	Sān duō	1. The peach (which represents longevity); 2. The pomegranate (which represents progeny or descendants); 3. The Buddha's hand (representing longevity and happiness).	The three plenties are three symbols that ancient Chinese people considered auspicious.	
Three Friends of Winter	歲寒三友	岁寒三友	Suìhán sānyǒu	Steadfastness, perseverance, and resilience; the scholar-gentleman's ideal in Confucianism	The three friends of winter are: bamboo, the pine tree, and the plum tree. These plants grow in the winter despite harsh conditions.	
Three Many	福壽三多	福寿三多	Fú shòu sān duō	The three many are the desires for: 1. Happiness; 2. Longevity; 3. Descendants.	The three many are three things the ancient Chinese people thought were desirable and auspicious to acquire.	
Three Rounds	三圓	三圆	Sān yuán	The "three rounds" could be depicted as any grouping of three round items. When these are placed together, they give an implied meaning of "high rank".	The Mandarin Chinese word for "round" (圓, yuán) is a homophonic pun with the word "first" (元, yuán), which in this context refers to getting the highest score in the imperial Chinese examination system. The number three in this context could then refer to coming first in all three stages of the exams.	
Tiger (Note: Sometimes depicted as a leopard.)	虎	虎	Hǔ	Protection from evil spirits and misfortune, heroism, longevity	The Mandarin Chinese word for "tiger" (虎, hǔ) sounds like the word for "to protect" (護, hù). Tigers are also the guardian spirit of agriculture; ancient Chinese believed that the tiger could devour "the demon of drought" and were considered heroic. The ancient Chinese believed that a tiger's hair turned white after five centuries and that they could live up to a millennium. Caishen is sometimes depicted using a tiger as a mode of transportation. The tiger is a member of the Chinese zodiac. See also: Tiger in Chinese culture.	
Toad	蟾蜍 蟾	蟾蜍 蟾	Chán chú Chán	Coins, wealth	In some Chinese languages, the word for "toad" (蟾) sounds like their word for "coin" or "money" (錢).	
Tortoise	龜	龟	Guī	Longevity; magnetic north, winter; endurance and physical strength; the divine and divinity.	Tortoises live very long. The ancient Chinese believed that the universe was round and the earth flat, like the lower body of a tortoise; hence tortoises were associated with the divine.	
Treasure bowl (Note: Alternatively referred to as the "treasure basin" in the English language.)	聚寶盆	聚宝盆	Jù bǎo pén	Wealth	This mythical object can infinitely reproduce an object placed inside of it, turning one treasure into many.	
Twelve Ornaments (Note: These twelve symbols are alternatively called the "Twelve Symbols of Imperial Authority" or the "Twelve Imperial Symbols" (十二章紋) in the English language.)	十二章	十二章	Shí'èr zhāng	1. The sun (日), symbolising enlightenment 2. The moon (月), symbolising the passive principle of yin 3. The Constellation of Three Stars (星辰), symbolising the Emperor's mercy 4. The mountain (山), symbolising the Emperor's stability and earth 5. The (five-clawed) dragon (龍), symbolising the Emperor's authority 6. The pheasant (華蟲), symbolising literary refinement 7. The two goblets (宗彝), symbolising filial piety, imperial loyalty, and metal 8. Seaweed (藻), symbolising purity, the Emperor's leadership, and water 9. Rice grain (粉米), symbolising prosperity, fertility, and wood 10. Fire (火), symbolising intellect, summer solstice, and fire 11. The Axe-head (黼), symbolising the Emperor's decisiveness 12. The Fu symbol (黻), symbolising collaboration and the Emperor's power and perception	According to the Zhou dynasty era Book of Rites, the number twelve is also the number of Heaven, as the Emperor was considered to be "the son of heaven" twelve symbols were chosen to represent his authority. The renowned writers Lu Xun, Qian Daosun, and Xu Shoushang from the Ministry of Education created the Twelve Symbols national emblem based on these symbols; this national emblem appeared on early coins from the Republic of China.	
Vase (or bottle)	瓶	瓶	Píng	Peace and safety, peace throughout the year (if depicted with flowers from each season)	The Mandarin Chinese word for "vase" (瓶, píng) sounds like the word for "peace" or "safety" (平安, píng ān).	
Willow	柳	柳	Liǔ	Poets and scholars; exorcism and "sweeping tombs" during the Qingming Festival; parting and sorrow	Willow trees are associated with poets and scholars who were inspired while walking amongst them. Willow branches were regarded as "magical" by the ancient Chinese people and associated with exorcism. The Mandarin Chinese word for "willow" (柳, liǔ) sounds like the Mandarin Chinese word for "to part" (離, lí); willow branches were given to friends and acquaintances who would depart to distant places.	
Writing brush and sycee	筆錠	笔锭	Bǐ dìng	The hope that everything will go as you wish	The Mandarin Chinese words for "writing brush" (筆, bǐ) and "ingot" (錠, dìng) sound like the term for "certainly" (必定, bì dìng).	
Zhenwu	真武	真武	Zhēnwǔ	Healing and protection.	Zhenwu is a Taoist god associated with healing and protection	
Zither	齊特琴	齐特琴	Qí tè qín	Fertility and marital harmony	Zithers in this context refer to guqin and se musical instruments. An example of a Chinese numismatic charm or amulet displaying the zither-theme would be one with an inscription that could be translated as "with the qin and the se be friendly to her" or "the qin and se zithers warm her heart" (琴瑟友之, qín sè yǒu zhī).	

== See also ==
- Chinese token (alternative currency)
- Bamboo tally
- Cash coins in feng shui
- Coin-sword
- I Ching divination § Coins
