= Numismatic charm =

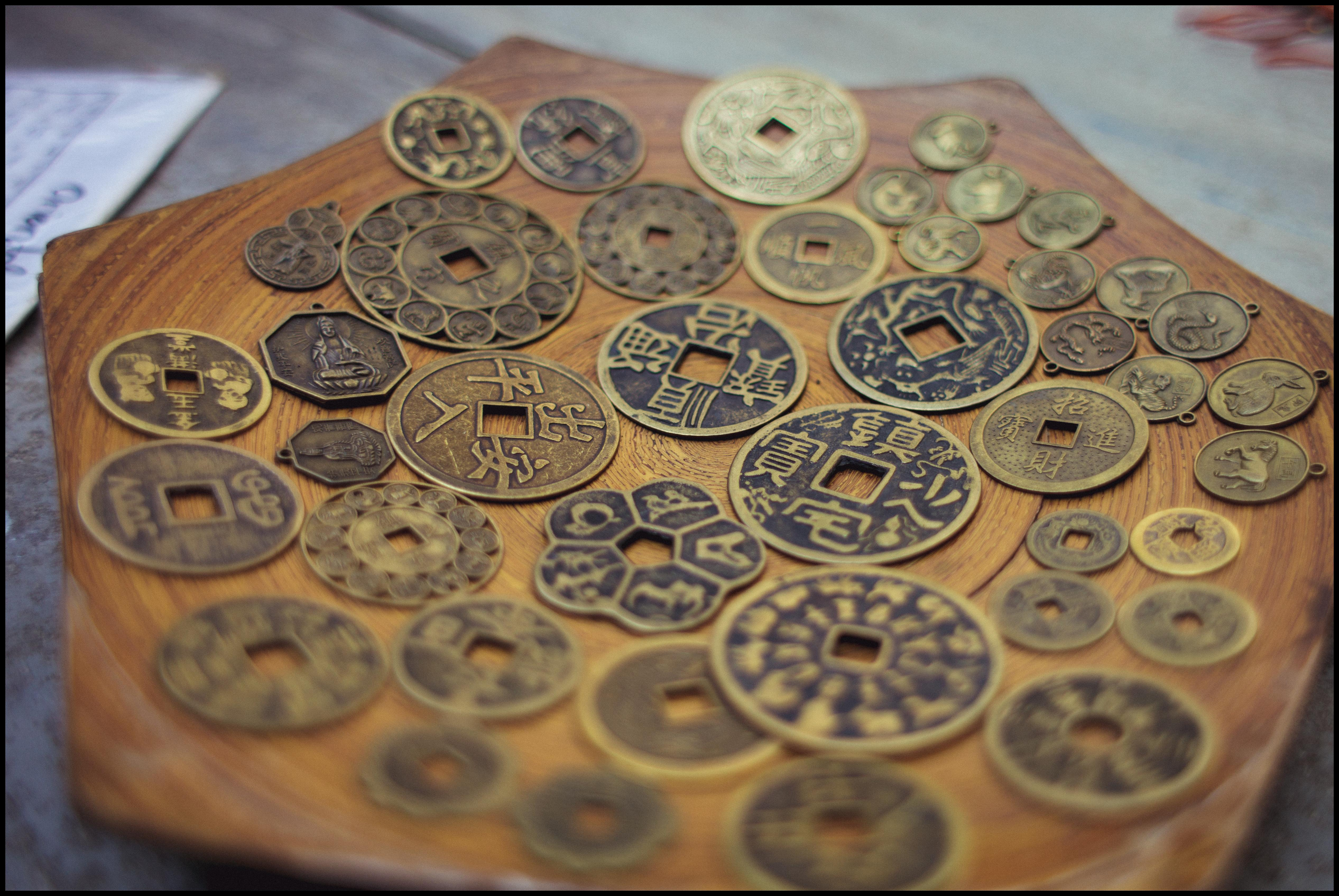
Different types of Yansheng coins in Hội An, Vietnam.

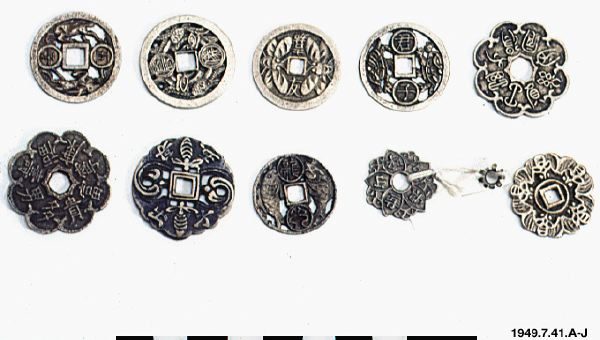
Japanese coin-like amulets on display at the Museum of Ethnography, Sweden.

Numismatic charms are East and Southeast Asian exonumic amulets and talismans, including:

- Buddhist coin charms
- Chinese burial money
- Chinese numismatic charms
- Coin-swords
- Confucian coin charms
- Hell money
- Horse coins
- Indonesian numismatic charms
- Japanese numismatic charms
- Joss paper
- Korean numismatic charms
- Lei Ting curse charms
- Lock charms
- Marriage coin charms
- Money tree
- Open-work charms
- Taoist coin charms
- Vault protector coins
- Vietnamese numismatic charms
- Zhengde Tongbao
