= Indonesian numismatic charm =

Decorative coins used for rituals

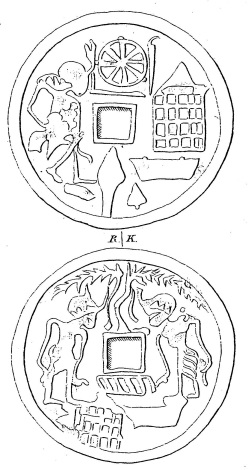
A Gobog Wayang from the island of Java.

Indonesian numismatic charms (Indonesian: Uang Gobog, Uang Gobog Wayang, Koin Gobog, Gobog Wayang, or simply Gobog; Dutch: Indonesische tempelmunten), also known as Indonesian magic coins, are a family of coin-like objects based on a similar Chinese family of coin charms, amulets, and talismans but evolved independently from them. Indonesian numismatic charms tend to have been influenced a lot by Hinduism, Islam, and the native culture and often depict religious imagery from Hinduism for this reason. The "magic coins" and temple coins from Indonesia are largely based on the Chinese cash coins introduced to the region during the Tang dynasty era in China, and during the local Majapahit era they began circulating in the region. Unlike with Chinese numismatic charms, the coin charms of Indonesia have not been as well documented both historically and in the modern era. A major modern day work about Indonesian numismatic charms in English is Joe Cribb's Magic coins of Java, Bali, and the Malay Peninsula which is a catalogue based on the collection of coin-shaped charms from the island Java acquired by Sir Thomas Stamford Raffles during his lifetime held in the British Museum, the book is further supplemented with data and information available from various other sources.

These amulets are most commonly found in the islands of Java and Bali, on the latter they are still commonly used today in both Hindu rituals, as tokens of faith, and supposed bringers of good fortune.

== Study of Indonesian numismatic charms ==
Under the rule of the Dutch East India Company (VOC) there was a lack of interest of the Dutch for both Javanese history and culture during this era as the activity of the company was solely devoted to the pursuits of profits and commercial interests. The first recorded Dutch publication mentioning Javanese temple coins (or gobogs) was in the year 1847.

After Sir Stamford Raffles ended his term as the Governor of the Dutch East Indies he authored the book The History of Java (1817) where he was noted to be the person who first wrote about the Gobog Wayang. Later brought 106 Gobog Wayang cash coins with him from Java to Great Britain. Five cash coin amulets were more added five thanks to a shipment from William Marsden, the author of The History of Sumatra. After Raffles's writing in The History of Java, new writings and opinions emerged about the Gobog Wayang cash coins.

Prior to the publication of the book Magic Coins of Java, Bali and the Malay Peninsula, 13th century to 20th century – A Catalogue based on the Raffles Collection of Coin-shaped charms from Java in the British Museum by the British numismatist Joe Cribb in the year 1999 the only major work on Indonesian numismatic charms, not many numismatic works have been published on them between its publication and the book Catalogue of the coinage of the Indian Archipelago and Malayan Peninsula by H.C. Millies 125 years earlier, in this work a large number of Javanese temple coins were featured but later works on Javanese "magic coins" and temple coins were highly fragmented. Other coverages of these amulets include the writing of the Russian Baron S. de Chaudoir in a book published in St. Petersburg in the year 1842, then another work by W.R. van Hoëvell, an activist in the Genootschaapvan Bataviaasch Kunsten en Wetenschappen in their annual journal in 1847, and then an article by the Dutch authors Netscher & van der Chijs in 1863.

Because of this high level of fragmentation in the literature Dr. T. D. Yih from the Netherlands believes that Cribb's Magic coins of Java, Bali, and the Malay Peninsula is a modern milestone and would be sure this book would revive the study of Indonesian numismatic charms which he termed to be "long neglected items". Dr. Yih claimed that Cribb's Magic coins of Java, Bali, and the Malay Peninsula will most certainly remain the standard catalogue for Indonesian numismatic charms for long time. The book contains a wealth of documentation not only of the numismatic charms themselves and how they came about, but also of their non-currency purposes and the background of the ceremonies conducted with them, what their symbolism represents, and mythological figures shown on them.

Dr. T. D. Yih criticised the work for having unclear criteria inclusion or exclusion of certain classes of pieces presented in the book and noted that many Chinese cash coin-shaped charms which were produced on the island of Java and the Malay Peninsula were not defined as "magic coins" despite meeting all the criteria. Another criticism came from the idea that the book only compared some "magic coins" that feature semicircular arcs of small stars with British coins but neglected the influence from other coins that circulated in the region such as the Spanish dollar, Mexican peso, and United States trade dollar as well as silver Chinese and Japanese coins.

== Javanese magic coins ==
Javanese "magic coins" and temple coins often feature Arabic and Malay inscriptions and tend to have metallic compositions very similar to Chinese cash coins which supports the idea that many of these coin-like amulets are in fact melted down Chinese cash coins turned into amulets. The first Gobog amulets in Java appeared during the Majapahit Empire, these Gobogs depicted Wayang characters and general Hindu mythology while after Islam was introduced to Java Arabic writing started appearing on Gobogs. Gobog Wayang amulets with materials containing copper and brass were known to be produced during the 18th century.

According to Panji, a numismatic from Yogyakarta, the function of Gobog amulets is as a complement to the requirements or ritual offerings in Java and the images on them depict the culture and religion of the Javanese community at that time. The Gobog itself symbolises both metal and money. Even though Gobog amulets symbolise money and are based on Chinese cash coins they don't have a nominal value and only feature religious symbols and Wayang stories on them.

Several publications have discussed the possible historical uses of Gobogs at length and the debate continues to this day as the existence and usefulness of Gobog Wayang coins have not been fully solved. Russian numismatist de Chaudoir hypothesised that the Gobog Wayang coins are a kind of "'temple medals " that are similar to comparable to the temple coins from China and Japan. Dutch numismatists Netscher and van der Chijs said that the Gobog Wayang coins were made in accordance to the pre-Islamic Hindu-Buddhist tradition in Java. They also got this explanation from old Javanese people, who said that the Gobog was a coin that had once circulated as a means of payment. One Gobog is the same as 5 Keteng (a Chinese cash coin, which once commonly circulated in Java). While 400 Gobogs were considered equal to one silver dirham and 4000 Gobogs are equivalent to one gold dinar. Millies on the other hand claimed the opposite, where he argued that Gobog Wayang coins were never used as currency or any other form as a means of exchange. Gobog Wayang coins were only used as a kind of amulet according to Millies, which is an imitation of Chinese temple coins, but depict ancient Javanese legends instead in the form of puppet shows. Millies classified Gobog Wayang coins in several types with Gobogs with pictures of men and women under a tree presumably being the oldest type of Gobog Wayang coins. Indonesian numismatist Puji Harsono said "Of all opinions, the most reasonable and acceptable is the opinion of Prof. H. McCillies and Joe Cribb" concerning the hypotheses raised about their form, origin, and use throughout Javanese history.

Today Gobog Wayang amulets are still believed to have supernatural properties in Central Java and are seen as a medium that supposedly protect its holder from misfortune. Sometimes Gobog Wayang amulets are installed in Wuwungan, the main pillar of the roof of a Javanese house, or are planted under the house for good luck.

== Bali ==
In the island of Bali Pis Bolong (Chinese cash coins) are used as coin-charms and while both authentic and fake Chinese cash coins are used in various rituals and ceremonies by the Balinese Hindu community and used to make souvenir items for tourists, there exist many local versions of the Pis Bolong which are in fact amulets based on these cash coins. It is common for traditional Balinese families to have 200 pieces of Pis Bolong in their household to the point that cash coins could be found in almost every corner of every traditional household on the island. Despite the high importance placed on Chinese cash coins in Balinese society the period, the dynasty, and the origin or meaning of the characters on them are largely seen as irrelevant as little interested in vested in them beyond their symbolic meanings in Hinduism and Balinese culture.

The authentic Pis Bolong tend to feature Traditional Chinese characters on them while the talisman Pis Bolong based on them may contain Balinese script, Pali, or Devanagari. According to local superstitions which are believed by some cash coins can be used to perform magic and witchcraft which adherents of Hinduism are human ways to influence nature in an effort to achieve their goals. Some Balinese people believe that "normal Pis Bolong" don't have any magical powers but only those with sacred symbolism on them.

Another way these "magical" Pis Bolong differentiate themselves from regular Pis Bolong is with the various images depicted on them such as various Hindu deities and other symbols such as horses, fishnets, crescents, among others. Commonly found Hindu deities, Pandavas, and Balinese mythological figures on these special amulet Pis Bolong coins are Arjuna, Bhima, Hanuman, Krishna, Sangut, and Twalen. These Pis Bolong with rerajahan (Balinese for "sacred drawing" or "sacred handwriting") were seen as supposedly carrying the magical powers of the symbols depicted on them and as long as the carrier has faith in the powers of the cash coin. Because of these rumours would arise if someone unlikely to gain something would carry around a Pis Bolong with rerajahan to gain it, for example if someone wins a footrace they will be rumoured to carry a Pis Jaran (a Pis Bolong with the rerajahan of a horse), while an ugly man who would marry a very beautiful female human would be rumoured to owned a Pis Rejuna.

=== Types of Pis Bolong with rerajahan ===
Variants of Pis Bolong with rerajahan
Variant	Image
Pis Anoman, these coin amulets depict Hanuman and supposedly give its holder more strength and energy like the wind.	
Pis Bima, depict Bhima and holders of these coin amulets supposedly become more agile and skilled in the art of warfare.	
Pis Bulan/Dewi Ratih, the Pis Bulan coin amulets supposedly make women or mothers more beautiful on the inside.	
Pis Delem, these coin amulets depict the character Dalem who is a henchman of the main villain in pewayangan stories, these Pis Bolong supposedly give its holder more confidence in debates.	
Pis Bolong Dewi Kunti, depict Kunti who is the mother of Pandava, these coin amulets and talismans supposedly brings a son or a daughter "the wisdom of a mother" to maintain the innter beauty of women.	
Pis Kresna, Kresna’s role in pewayangan functions of a guide which directs the other characters to wisdom and virtue. Those who make fetish pis Kresna are believed to have the truth on their side, be honest, and would always uphold justice.	
Pis Pandawa, these cash coin talismans depict Dharmawangsa, Bhima, Arjuna, Nakula, and Sahadeva who are the five sons of Pandu according to the Mahabratha myth, these Pis Bolong supposedly give its holder more dignity, physical strength, and intelligence.
Pis Nakula-Sadewa, depict Nakula and Sahadeva who are twin brothers belonging to the Pandava, these Pis Bolong supposedly brings its holder good fortune and help them with maintaining relationships with their friend and relatives.	
Pis Nawa Sanga ("coin of the nine direction of winds"), supposedly protects its holder from evil spirits, bring good fortune, and would supposedly remove all obstacles in their way.	
Pis Rejuna (with a Dedari), a coin amulet with the Arjuna alongside a Dedari (a type of Balinese angel), supposedly makes its holder idolised by young women because Arjuna is the most physically attractive of the Pandavas.	
Pis Rejuna (without a Dedari), these coin amulets have an image of Arjuna on them, these Pis Bolong either supposedly make its holder more attractive for women or help maintain a romantic relationship such as a marriage.	
Pis Sangut, these coin-amulets supposedly have the magical powers Sangut figures in wayang (pewayangan) stories, this means that the holders of Pis Sangut supposedly become very good at arguing.	
Pis Bolong Siwa, depict Batara Guru who is the highest God in the Balinese Hindu religion, these Pis Bolong supposedly protect its holder from evil spirits and give them higher spiritual powers.	
Pis Twalen / Pis Malen, holders of Pis Twalen/Pis Malen will supposedly feel calm when confronted with any situation. These coin charms will also supposedly cause the holder to be respected by their enemies and make them able to influence the thoughts and opinions of other people.	

== Number of Indonesian numismatic charms historically produced and discovered ==
In Joe Cribb's Magic coins of Java, Bali, and the Malay Peninsula it is claimed on several occasions that the practice of imitating by using the use of original Javanese numismatic charms for the production of moulds was a common practice in Java which would suggest that there was a large scale production of Javanese gobog wayang cash coins throughout the ages and that they were used by a large number of people on the island. however Dr. T. D. Yih criticised this assumption based on the data coin-finds in Java that are mentioned in the Minutes of the Batavian Society of Arts and Science (MBSAS) in the period from 1864 to 1914, these numbers show that the quantity of Javanese gobogs found is significantly smaller and usually in smaller numbers than Chinese cash coins and silver Hindu-pieces which are usually found in great numbers in the region. As well as the fact that Magic coins of Java, Bali, and the Malay Peninsula ignores the Gobog-finds referred to in an article written about them by Robert Wicks published in 1986.

A notable find of a large number of Gobogs in Java occurred in the year 1893 when people found 415 buried Gobog Wayang cash coins near Bagelen. Evidence for the large scale production of Gobog Wayang is found only from the beginning of the 20th century onwards. Colonial Dutch numismatist Jacobus Anne van der Chys suspected that there was a fabrication unit in East Java in the year 1903, as he noted the frequent offers of brand-new Gobog charms from this region during this era. Large finds of Gobog charms occurred in 1915 where around 2500 amulets were found in the Kediri Regency and according to the Dutch journal "Oudheidkundig Verslag" (Antiquity Report) more than 8500 Gobogs were discovered in Java around the year 1940, the largest of these finds of Gobog charms numbered 2500 and 4561 in number of specimens and were in the regencies of Tritikoelon and Banjoemas, respectively.

== See also ==
- Japanese numismatic charm
- Korean numismatic charm
- Vietnamese numismatic charm

== Sources ==
- Catalogus der numismatische verzameling van het Bataviaasch Genootschap van Kunsten en Wetenschappen by Jacobus Anne van der Chijs, 1831–1905 (in Dutch). Batavia, Dutch East Indies (1896).
