= Marriage coin charm =

Category of Asian numismatic charm

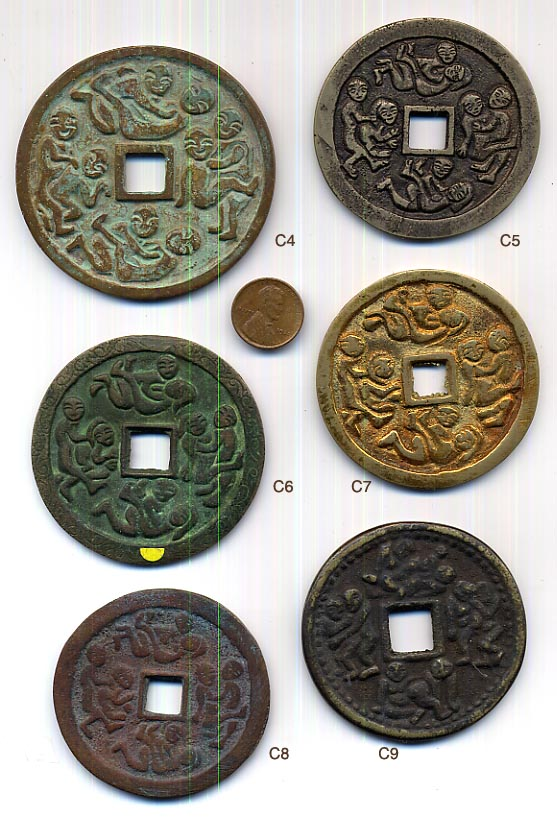
A group of Chinese sex education coins, each showing four different sexual positions

Marriage coin charms (traditional Chinese: 夫婦和合花錢; simplified Chinese: 夫妇和合花钱; pinyin: fū fù hé hé huā qián) are a category of Chinese, Japanese, Korean, and Vietnamese numismatic charms that depict marriage, harmonious, or sexual imagery. These coin charms often imitate the design of Chinese cash coins, but can exist in many different shapes and sizes.

== Names ==
Marriage coin charms are known by many names, including secret play coins (Traditional Chinese: 秘戲錢; Simplified Chinese: 秘戏钱; Pinyin: mì xì qián), secret fun coins, hide (evade) the fire (of lust) coins (Traditional Chinese: 避火錢; Simplified Chinese: 避火钱; Pinyin: bì huǒ qián), Chinese marriage coins, Chinese love coins, Chinese spring money (Traditional Chinese: 春錢; Simplified Chinese: 春钱; Pinyin: chūn qián), Chinese erotic coins, and Chinese wedding coins.

== Types and themes ==
Marriage coin charms can display various symbols related to marriage. They may depict dates and peanuts symbolising the wish for reproduction, lotus seeds symbolising "continuous births", chestnuts symbolising male offspring, pomegranates symbolising fertility, brans symbolising sons that will be successful, "dragon and phoenix" candles, cypress leaves, qilins, bronze mirrors, shoes, saddles, and other things associated with traditional Chinese weddings. Since ancient times, three of the most important events that could occur in the life of a Chinese person in accordance to traditional Chinese culture were success in the imperial examination, which would result in a government position as well as the prestige and wealth that is associated with it, getting married, and having a large number male offspring to carry out the proper duties of filial piety and ancestor worship which were all proscribed to these sons by the Confucian system.

=== Dragon and fenghuang charms ===
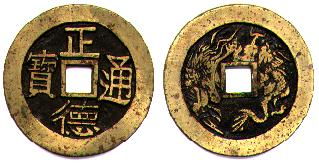
A Zhengde Tongbao (正德通寶) fantasy cash coin charm featuring the image of a dragon and a fenghuang on its reverse

A number of marriage numismatic charms depict the image of a dragon and a fenghuang on their reverse sides, usually the obverse sides of these amulets often contain a cash coin inscription, fantasy cash coin inscription, or a more auspicious inscription related to either marriage or having plenty.

Zhengde Tongbao (正德通寶) fantasy cash coin charms commonly feature the image of a dragon and a fenghuang on their reverses, when a Chinese dragon and fenghuang are shown together they often symbolise the union of a man and a woman meaning that these Zhengde Tongbao charms were used as Chinese marriage charms. Although Gary Ashkenazy claims that the dragon and fenghuang symbolises matrimony, it is argued by Edgar J. Mandel in his book Metal Charms and Amulets of China that the dragon and fenghuang actually represent the power of the imperial Chinese government where the dragon represents the Emperor and the fenghuang the Empress. A popular saying in imperial China was "If a household has a Zhengde coin, there will be material wealth and honour for ten thousand years" (家有正德錢富貴萬萬年, jiā yǒu zhèng dé qián fù guì wàn wàn nián).

Some dragon and fenghuang charms display the obverse inscription Zhouyuan Tongbao (周元通寶), which is an inscription used by Later Zhou. Although most of the numismatic charms that display this inscription are produced during a later period, charms with this inscription are very popular throughout Chinese history. In 956, Chai Rong, also known as Emperor Shizong of Later Zhou, had ordered that the bronze Buddha statues in the Buddhist temples, as well as all the bronze items which were owned by the people of the Later Zhou Empire, had to be turned in to the imperial government. These bronze items were confiscated in order to manufacture Later Zhou cash coins. Because Buddhist statues were used to produce these cash coins it is believed by some people that Zhouyuan Tongbao cash coins were especially auspicious, which is why they later became a very popular design for later made Chinese numismatic charms.

=== Fenghua Xueyue ("Wind, Flowers, Snow, Moon") ===
The most common inscriptions that is found on Chinese love charms is Fenghua Xueyue (風花雪月) which literally translate to mean "wind, flowers, snow and moon". The expression used in this inscription is most likely intentionally obscure which makes it to be open to various interpretations. The expression Fenghua Xueyue is generally used in China in order to describe a happy and lively place, or could be used to describe something that is either frivolous or trivial. One of the more plausible explanations for the phrase Fenghua Xueyue appearing on marriage numismatic charms is that each word in this context is used to represent a different Chinese goddess.

The inscription may also be a reference to the 4 volume Chinese erotic novel entitled Su'e pian (素娥篇) made during the late Ming dynasty period (which was written around 1640). The erotic novel describes the romantic adventures of a man named Wu Sansi (武三思), an official of the Chinese dynasty Tang dynasty and his aunt Wu Zetian's Zhou dynasty, and a concubine who was described as being "beautiful" named Su E (素娥). The woman Su E is sometimes also referred to as the "Lady of the Moon". In the novel Wu Sansi and Su E are inspired to have sex in a variety of natural settings using 43 different sexual positions, which were all illustrated wood engravings that accompany the text of the novel.

=== Fish ===
A design of Chinese, Korean, and Vietnamese marriage amulets display a pair of fish on one side and the inscription Yu Shuang (魚双; Korean: Eo ssang; Vietnamese: Ngư Song, "Pair of Fish") on the other side. In various Oriental cultures fish are associated with plenty and abundance. Fish are furthermore noted for their prolific ability to reproduce and that when they swim that this was in joy and are therefore associated with a happy and harmonious marriage. In Feng Shui, a pair of fish are associated with conjugal bliss and the joys of being in a matrimonial union.

=== Geese ===
Among the various types of Chinese marriage charms are those that use Chinese zodiac animals as well as other animals in combination to symbolise a harmonious matrimony. For example, a Song dynasty period brass charm that is 51 millimeters (2.0 in) in diameter with geese features all the twelve animals of the Chinese zodiac in a circle on one side and wild geese on the other side. The geese on this amulet symbolise marital fidelity because of the legend that geese are monogamous and remain together for life. During marriage ceremonies in ancient China, libations were made to the geese when the bride arrived at her husband's home. This tradition goes back to antiquity: at that time, a goose was offered to the bride. This amulet also features an image of a lotus flower, which feeds the goose and reinforces the symbolism of happy union because of the homophony with the character lian, "to unite", "together". This particular type of amulet was offered at weddings.

=== Sex education coins ===
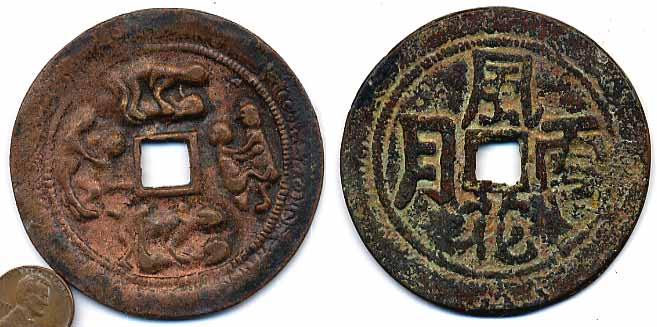
A Fenghua Xueyue (風花雪月) sex education cash coin

Some marriage coin charms illustrate how the newlywed couple should perform on their wedding night to meet their responsibilities and obligations to produce children. In the case of these coins, "charm" in this context is a catchall term for coin-shaped items which were not official (or counterfeit) money. However, these numismatic objects were necessarily considered "magical" or "lucky", as some of these Chinese numismatic charms can be used as "mnemonic coins".

Sex acts were traditionally only scarcely depicted in Chinese art but stone carvings from the Han dynasty showcasing sexual intercourse were found and bronze mirrors with various sexual themes were common during the Tang dynasty. It was also during the Tang dynasty that coins graphically depicting sex started being produced. Chinese love charms often have the inscription "wind, flowers, snow and moon" (風花雪月) which is an obscure verse referring to a happy and frivolous setting, although every individual character might also be used to identify a Chinese goddess or the "Seven Fairy Maidens" (七仙女). Other Chinese wedding charms often have inscriptions like fēng huā yí rén (風花宜人), míng huáng yù yǐng (明皇禦影), and lóng fèng chéng yàng (龍鳳呈樣).

These charms could also be used in brothels where a traveller could use the illustrations to make a request of a prostitute without knowing the local language.

A common design for Korean marriage charms displays scenes of a heterosexual couple engaging in different positions of sexual intercourse.

=== "Song of Unending Sorrow" charms ===
"Song of Unending Sorrow" charms, or "Song of Unending Regret" charms, are a common type of marriage coin charm, that might be Chinese, Japanese, Korean Taiwanese, or Vietnamese in origin, that depict part of the 9th century poem Chang hen ge written by Bai Juyi. "Song of Unending Sorrow" charms display four heterosexual couples having sex in various positions (or they are supposed to represent one couple having in four different positions) in the area surrounding the square centre hole of the coin. Surrounding the couples having sex are the Chinese characters representing the spring (春), wind (風), peaches (桃), and plums (李), which is a reference to the first four characters of a line from the Chang hen ge poem which translates into English as "Gone were the breezy spring days when the peach and plum trees were in bloom" in reference to the death of Yang Guifei.

=== Spring ===
Marriage coin charms are sometimes referred to as "spring money" (春錢) or "spring coins" in refers to an ancient Chinese springtime ritual where young boys and young girls would be separated from each other by a stream and would then sing love songs to towards the other gender on the other side of the stream. This ancient tradition is still practiced by a number of ethnic minorities in China today.

=== Vietnamese marriage charms ===
Vietnamese marriage amulets often display dragon (龍) and phoenix (鳳) motifs, this is because the Vietnamese dragon is often used as a symbol for males, while the Phượng Hoàng (or "phoenix") is used to represent females. When the phoenix is shown together with the dragon this is often meant as a metaphor for the Emperor and Empress.

Some marriage amulets have the obverse inscription Trường Mạng Phú Quý (長命富貴) written in seal script, which translates into English to "Long life, riches, and honour". This inscription symbolises good fortune in marriage as well as protection. There are also some Vietnamese marriage amulets with the inscription Thọ Sơn Phúc Hải (壽山福海, "longevity, mountain, happiness, and sea"), which is a part of a Chinese congratulatory phrase "May your age be as Mount Tai and your happiness as the Eastern Sea" (壽比南山福如東海).

Some Vietnamese marriage amulets contain the Daoist Âm and Dương symbol (or Thái cực đồ), this is because in Daoist Âm symbolises the feminine and Dương symbolises the masculine. Further symbols may include the lotus flower, known as "荷" (Hà) or "蓮" (Sen). In Mandarin Chinese the word for "lotus" has a homonymous sound with the word which means "to bind" as in a marriage contract, "to love", and "to be modest".

== List of marriage coin charms by inscription ==
List of marriage coin charms by inscription:

List of marriage coin charms by inscription
Transliteration	Traditional Chinese	Simplified Chinese	Literal English translation	Meaning	Image
Fenghua Xueyue	風花雪月	风花雪月	"Wind, flowers, snow, and moon"	A metaphor for sexual intercourse.	
Fenghua Yiren	風花宜人	风花宜人	"Wind and flowers delight men"	This may or may not be a reference to the fact that in ancient times, the term "Yi ren" (宜人) was a title given to the wives of government officials of the fifth degree.	
Minghuang Yuying	明皇禦影	明皇御影	"Emperor Ming imperial shadow"	The ming huang (明皇), in this case, refers to Emperor Xuanzong (685–762 AD), also known as "Emperor Ming". Emperor Xuanzong of Tang's concubine Yang Guifei was considered one of the Four Beauties of ancient China.	
Longfeng Chengxiang	龍鳳呈樣	龙凤呈样	"The dragon and fenghuang become a good omen", "prosperity brought by the dragon and phoenix", and "may you have excellent good fortune".	A common expression used to congratulate newlyweds on their marriage.	
Tongxie Daolao; Fugui Shuangquan	同偕到老 富貴雙全	同偕到老 富贵双全	"May you grow old together (as husband and wife)" "Wealth and honour (are) both complete"	Happiness in marriage.	
Yu Shuang	魚雙	魚双	"Pair of fish"	Conjugal bliss and the joys of being in a matrimonial union.	
Chunfeng Taoli	春風桃李	春风桃李	"Spring, wind, peaches and plums"	A reference to the 9th century poem Chang hen ge written by Bai Juyi.	
Jinyu Mantang	金玉滿堂	金玉满堂	"May gold and jade fill your house (halls)"	An auspicious saying.	
Zhengde Tongbao	正德通寶	正德通宝	"Zhengde circulating treasure"	Fantasy Ming dynasty cash coin.	
Zhouyuan Tongbao	周元通寶	周元通宝	"Beginning of the Zhou, circulating treasure"	A historical cash coin inscription that is thought to be auspicious because the original cash coins were cast from molten Buddhist statues.	

== See also ==
- Spintria, a similar type of coin from ancient Rome.

== Sources ==
- Amulets of Vietnam by Craig Greenbaum. Published: 2006. Retrieved: 23 February 2020.
- Edgar J. Mandel. Metal Charms and Amulets of China.
- Great Dictionary of China Numismatics (中國錢幣大辭典) - Chinese Charms (壓勝錢編), January, 2013. 995 pages. (in Mandarin Chinese).
- Hartill, David (September 22, 2005). Cast Chinese Coins. Trafford, United Kingdom: Trafford Publishing. ISBN 978-1412054669.
- op den Velde, Wybrand; Hartill, David (12 November 2013). 'Cast Korean Coins and Charms. New Generation Publishing. ISBN 978-0755215942.
