= Lei Ting curse charm =

Chinese numismatic charm

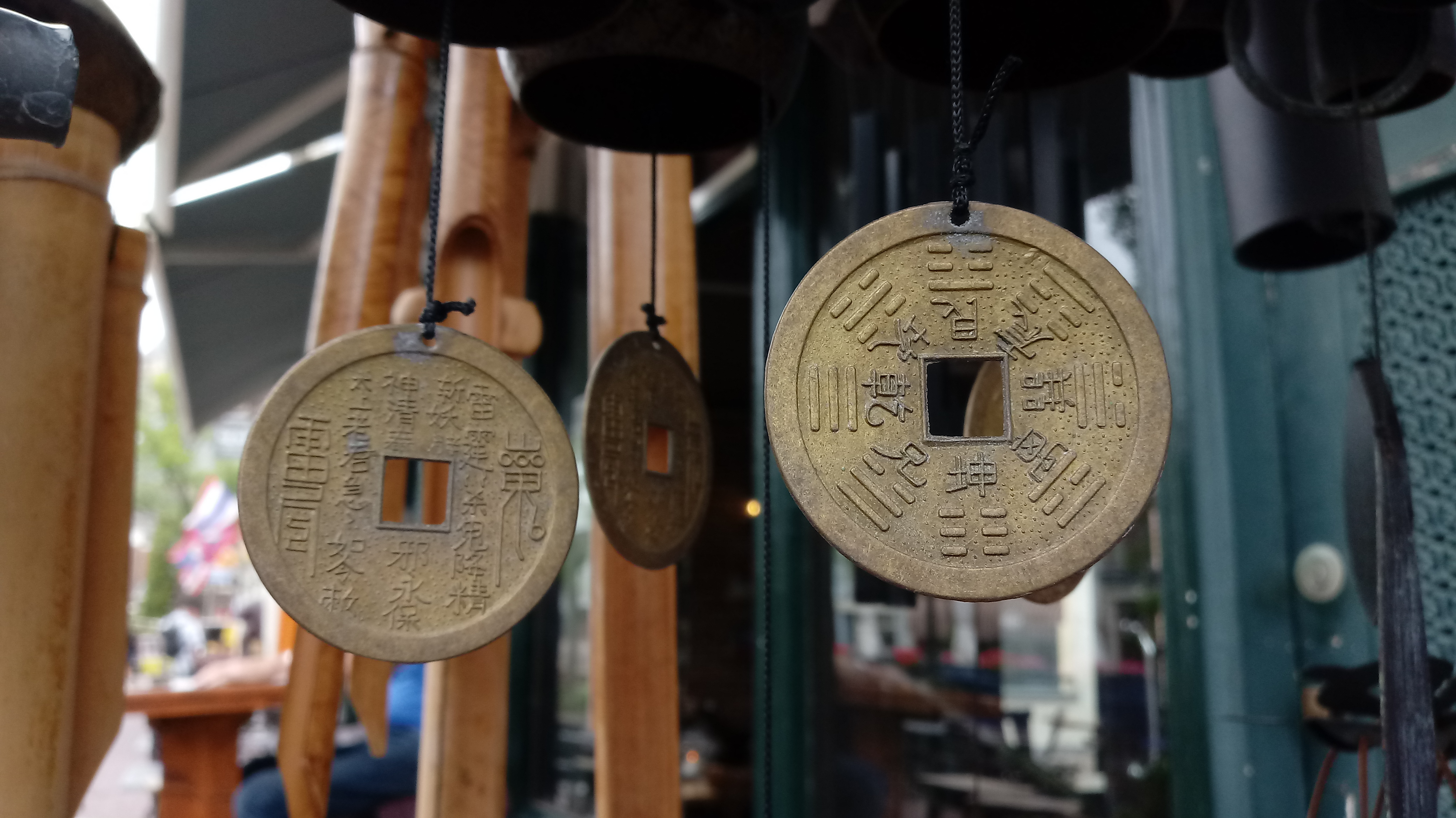
Modern machine-made Lei Ting curse charms containing Taoist imagery in Delft, Netherlands.

Lei Ting curse charms (traditional Chinese: 符咒錢; simplified Chinese: 符咒钱; pinyin: fú zhòu qián), or Lôi Đình curse charms, are a type of Chinese and Vietnamese numismatic charms. These charms can be described as a talismanic coin as they are often based on Chinese cash coins but can also have round holes instead of square ones and may also be shaped like gourd charms.

Lei Ting curse charms contain inscriptions that request the Taoist God of Thunder Leigong to expel evil spirits and maleficent bogies through a magical spell incantation which usually calls upon Leigong by claiming that the inscription is in fact an order from Laozi himself. In some cases these coin charms request that Leigong should act "with the speed of the law" - “急急如律令.”

== Overview ==
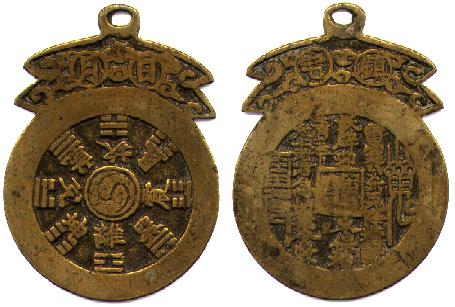
A Lei ting curse gourd charm.

The name "Lei Ting" (雷霆) comes from Lei (雷) which is an abbreviation for "Leigong" (雷公) or "Leishen" (雷神) who is the god of thunder and one of the officials in the celestial Ministry of Thunder and Storm who could punish on behalf of Heaven, and Ting (霆) meaning "thunderbolts" as these thunderbolts would be used for the destruction of malicious spirits as it is the noise of the thunder produced by the drums hold by Leigong that causes death of the wrong doers. It is not uncommon for the characters Lei (雷), Ling (令, "to order"), Sha (杀, "to kill"), and Gui (鬼, "spirit" or "ghost") on Lei Ting curse charms at both extremes of the inscription to be written in Taoist Fuwen as opposed to with Hanzi characters, and although the religious sects and orders of Taoism usually wish for the meaning of Fuwen characters to remain a secret the Fu characters used for these terms are actually well known.

The term "Lei Ting curse charm" is a term used primarily by Chinese collectors for these coin charms.

Lei Ting curse charms are an evolution of the ancient Chinese belief that everything is controlled by spirits and evil spirits should be dealt with in the same manner as human adversaries should be treated, in Ancient China a large number of exorcists would roam the streets and throw spears into the air to scare evil spirits away, at the same time human prisoners would have their limbs dismembered and would be openly displayed outside the city gates to scare evil spirits away proclaiming that the same fate shall fall upon them if they dare go into the city. According to Chinese legends Hanzi characters were created by the Yellow Emperor and after "the millet fell from the heavens and the spirits cried at night", this was because legends describe spirits of being afraid of being controlled by "the magical properties of Chinese characters" as described in the Huainanzi. As Hanzi characters were used on amulets magical powers were prescribed to them by the superstitious, during the Han dynasty Chinese numismatic charms started to be worn as pendants to protect its wearers from the influence of bogies and evil spirits. Leigong became one of the most commonly requested Taoist Gods to request for protection.

The ancient Chinese people believed that decrees and mandates issued by the government had absolutely authoritative power over them which expanded their belief that Hanzi characters somehow had magical properties. Taoist exorcists and priests claimed that they could use Hanzi characters and Fu script to make decrees that influence the spiritual world, for this reason the inscriptions of Lei Ting curse charms resemble official decrees and documents issued by the government of imperial China but ordered by Laozi and the person being decreed was Leigong whose job it is to punish people guilty of moral crimes such as unfilial sons or daughter as well as evil entities using the Taoist magic to harm others. The reason why Laozi was selected to be the one decreeing the order was because he was a prestigious figure who had the power needed to enforce said decree. In some cases rather than Leigong Laozi himself was used to either scare away or kill bogies and malicious spirits. Laozi is often referred to as "Taishang Laojun" (Chinese: 太上老君; Pinyin: Tàishàng Lǎojūn) on Lei Ting curse charms, this title was posthumously given to him by the Emperor of the Song dynasty in the year 1013 AD. Like government decrees inscriptions on Lei Ting curse charms would carry phrases such as "quickly, quickly, this is an order" or "respect this command" to emulate them. Some curse charms contain the Chinese character for "dead ghost" as living people are startled to see a ghost and fear seeing them as ghosts are once living people who have died, the ancient Chinese people believed that ghosts themselves feared "dead ghosts" and would be equally startled in the same way humans feared regular ghosts and that charms and amulets that had the Chinese or Fuwen character for "dead ghost" would scare ghosts away.

Lei Ting curses appear on a wide variety of Chinese and Vietnamese numismatic charms such as those containing Taoist "magic" writing, a type of secret script used by Taoist priests which ancient Chinese people assigned magical properties to, charms containing images of various other Taoist deities such as Xuanwu, and other Lei Ting curse charms can have Taoist symbols on their reverse such as the Bagua (eight trigrams).

These amulets were traditionally bought from Taoist masters and because they were often written in an exotic style and using Taoist "magic" writing, it was not uncommon for the inscriptions to be only readable by the Taoist masters who issued them.

== List of magic incantations found on Lei Ting curse charms ==
The inscriptions of Lei Ting curse charms are read up to down and then right to left. Inscriptions can contain both Chinese characters and Taoist "magic" writing. Usually these curse charms request Leigong to fight malicious spirits and bogies but Laozi may also be called upon for this task.

The following inscriptions are found on Lei Ting curse charms:

| Traditional Chinese | Simplified Chinese | Hanyu Pinyin | English translation | Image |
|---|---|---|---|---|
| 雷霆八部，誅鬼降精，斬妖辟邪，永保神清，奉太上老君，急急如律令，敕 | 雷霆八部，诛鬼降精，斩妖辟邪，永保神清，奉太上老君，急急如律令，敕 | Léi Tíng bā bù, zhū guǐ jiàng jīng, zhǎn yāo pì xié, yǒng bǎo shén qīng, fèng Tài Shàng Lǎo Jūn, jí jí rú Lǜ Lìng, chì. | O Thunder God, destroy devils, subdue bogies, and drive away evil influences. Receive this command of Taishang Laojun. Swiftly, as the statute commands. | |
| 雷走殺鬼降精，斬妖出邪永保，神情奉，太上老君急汲之令 | 雷走杀鬼降精，斩妖出邪永保，神情奉，太上老君急汲之令 | léi zǒu shā guǐ jiàng jīng, zhǎn yāo chū xié yǒng bǎo, shén qíng fèng, tài shàng lǎo jūn jí jí zhī lìng | God of Thunder vanquish and exterminate the malicious ghosts and bring us purity. Separate the heads from the demons, expel that which is malicious and keep us safe from harm forever more. Let this decree from Tai Shang Lao Jun (Laozi) be executed quickly. | |
| 雷霆{雷霆}殺鬼降精，斬妖辟邪永保神清，奉太上老君急{急}如律令敕 | 雷霆{雷霆}杀鬼降精，斩妖辟邪永保神清，奉太上老君急{急}如律令敕 | léi tíng { léi tíng } shā guǐ xiáng jīng, zhǎn yāo pì xié yǒng bǎo shén qīng, fèng tài shàng lǎo jūn jí { jí } rú lǜ lìng chì | God of Thunder use your thunderbolts, God of Thunder use your thunderbolts to kill malicious ghosts and send purity down to the world. Separate the heads from the demons, expel that which is malicious and keep us safe from harm forever more. Receive this edict from Taishang Laojun himself and let this order be executed as fast as Lü Ling. | |
| 太上咒曰天元地方，六律九，章，符神到處萬鬼，滅亡急如律，令 | 太上咒曰天元地方，六律九，章，符神到处万鬼，灭亡急如律，令 | tài shàng zhòu yuē tiān yuán dì fāng, liù lǜ jiǔ, zhāng, fú shén dào chù wàn guǐ, miè wáng jí rú lǜ lìng | Laozi curses by saying that the Heaven is round and the earth is square, and exclaims the Nine Songs of the Six Temperaments. The spirit of the magic writing (which in this context refers to 符文, Fu script) will destroy the ten thousand ghosts everywhere, let this decree be acted upon as fast as Lü Ling. | |
| 雷霆號令 (obverse) (Note: This Lei Ting curse charm resembles regular cash coins but has a four character obverse inscription and a four character reverse inscription, both of which the obverse is written in seal script, while the reverse is written in Taoist "Magic" writing (or fuwen) and are read top-bottom-right-left.) 永保壽考 (reverse) | 雷霆号令 (obverse) 永保寿考 (reverse) | Léi Tíng hào lìng (obverse) yǒng bǎo shòu kǎo (reverse) | Thunderbolts of Leigong be commanded. (obverse); To protect (us) eternally and to (let us) enjoy a long life. (reverse) | |
| 咸豐通寶 (obverse) 雷霆八部，誅鬼降精，斬妖辟邪，永保神清，奉太上老君，急急如律令，敕 (reverse) | 咸丰通宝 (obverse) 雷霆八部，诛鬼降精，斩妖辟邪，永保神清，奉太上老君，急急如律令，敕 (reverse) | Xián fēng tōng bǎo (obverse); Léi Tíng bā bù, zhū guǐ jiàng jīng, zhǎn yāo pì xié, yǒng bǎo shén qīng, fèng Tài Shàng Lǎo Jūn, jí jí rú Lǜ Lìng, chì. (reverse) | Xianfeng Tongbao (obverse); O Thunder God, destroy devils, subdue bogies, and drive away evil influences. Receive this command of Taishang Laojun and execute it as fast as Lü Ling. (reverse) | |
| 雷 雷 雷 雷 雷 (obverse) 敕 令 (reverse) | 雷 雷 雷 雷 雷 (obverse) 敕 令 (reverse) | Léi léi léi léi léi (obverse) chì lìng (reverse) | Thunder thunder thunder thunder thunder (obverse); Immediate command (reverse) | |

== See also ==
- Chinese spiritual world concepts
- Ghosts in Chinese culture
- Horse coin
- Zhengde Tongbao

== Sources ==
- Hartill, David (2005). Cast Chinese Coins: A Historical Catalogue. Trafford. ISBN 978-1-4120-5466-9.
- Zheng, Yiwei, ed. (2004). 花钱图典 [Classic Chinese Charms] (in Chinese). China: Wen Hua Press.
