= Confucian coin charm =

Confucian coin charms are a category of Chinese and Vietnamese numismatic charms that incorporate messages from Confucian philosophy into their inscriptions. Generally these amulets resemble Chinese cash coins but contain messages of the traditions, rituals, and moral code of Confucianism, such as the idea of "filial piety" (孝) and the Confucian ideals of "righteousness" (義). During the 19th century these Confucian messages were also featured on a number of 1 mạch Vietnamese cash coins during the Nguyễn dynasty.

== Themes ==
Confucian charms are Chinese and Vietnamese numismatic charms that depict the traditions, rituals, and moral code of Confucianism, such as filial piety and "righteousness". Examples of Confucian charms would include a charm that depicts Shenzi carrying firewood on a shoulder pole, open-work charms depicting stories from "The Twenty-Four Examples of Filial Piety" (二十四孝), the "five relationships" (五倫), Meng Zong kneeling beside bamboo, Dong Yong (a Han dynasty era man) working a hoe, Wang Xiang with a fishing pole. Confucian inscriptions include fù cí zǐ xiào (父慈子孝; "the father is kind and the son is filial") read clockwise, yí chū fèi fǔ (義出肺腑; "righteousness comes from the bottom of one's heart"), zhōng jūn xiào qīn (忠君孝親; "be loyal to the sovereign and honor one's parents"), huā è shuāng huī (花萼雙輝; "petals and sepals both shine"), and jìng xiōng ài dì (敬兄愛第; "revere older brothers and love younger brothers").

Confucian beliefs of good fortune, longevity, gaining a high government official position, and wealth can be seen at many other categories of Chinese numismatic charms, such as Chinese charms with auspicious inscriptions, good fortune and longevity charms, open-work charms, and chinese pendant charms, among any other categories.

== Bird-worm seal script charms ==
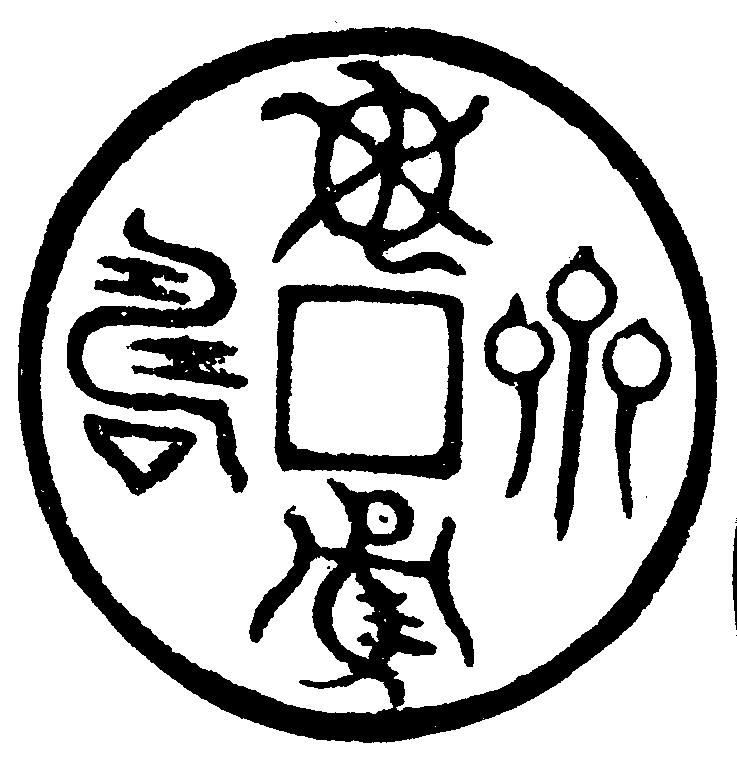
A Song dynasty period bird-worm seal script coin charm

There are a number of Chinese numismatic charms which have inscriptions written in bird-worm seal script. Bird-worm seal script is one of the oldest Chinese scripts, which originated more than 2500 years ago, because of its attractive style, Chinese kings and nobles during the Warring States period liked using bird-worm seal script on their personal seals and as decoration on various important objects such as their weaponry. In later dynasties this style of Chinese calligraphy would be used to write the inscriptions of a number of Chinese numismatic charms.

During the Song dynasty period a bird-worm seal script coin charm was produced with the inscription Guihe Qishou (traditional Chinese: 龜鶴齊壽; simplified Chinese: 龟鹤齐寿; pinyin: Guī hè qí shòu), which translates to "Live as long as the tortoise and the crane". This inscription is based on the fact that the Chinese traditionally believed that both the tortoise and the heron (crane) live long lives. The inscription of this coin charm is read top-bottom-right-left and is 6.4 centimeters in diameter, has a thickness of 4 millimeters, and a weight of 71.1 grams.

The main characteristic of bird-worm seal script is that the characters resemble animals. Because of this the top character (龜, "Tortoise") actually resembles a tortoise, the bottom character (鶴, "Heron") looks like a bird, the character located to the right or the central square home (齊, "Are equal to" or "be the same as") resembles 3 "worms", and the left character (壽, "Longevity") looks like it has a s-shaped "worm" running through the middle of it.

A Mongol-led Yuan and Ming dynasty period Chinese coin amulet contains both bird-worm seal script and regular script, this charm also has the same inscription as the aforementioned inscription (龜鶴齊壽) written in both scripts, each on one side or the coin. The Yuan and Ming period charm is slightly smaller than the Song period charm with a diameter of 5.81 centimeters. In 2014 a specimen or this charm was sold by China Guardian Auctions for about $1,780 (¥11,500).

== Confucian open-work charms ==
=== Confucian filial piety ===
Some Chinese open-work charms depict the concept of filial piety from Confucianism, for example there is an open-work charm which displays four stories from "The Twenty-Four Examples of Filial Piety", in these stories examples are given of how children should obey their parents and respect the elderly which are all central themes of Confucianism. These open-work charms are also part of a larger family of Confucian charms.

=== Pavilions or temples ===
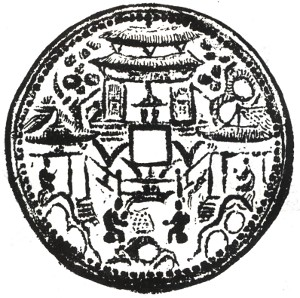
An illustration of an open-work charm with this design

Open-work charms depicting pavilions and temples first started appearing during the Song dynasty, and the majority of these are thought to have been manufactured in the city of Dali. An example of an open-work charm with a pavilion in its design possibly depicts the "Temple of Confucius", within the pavilion of this charm musician is seen playing the guqin while outside of the building two men are seen playing weiqi. Outside of the pavilion bamboo plants and longevity stones could be seen. It is believed that the people in this charm represent Confucius himself.

== Confucian messages on Vietnamese cash coins ==
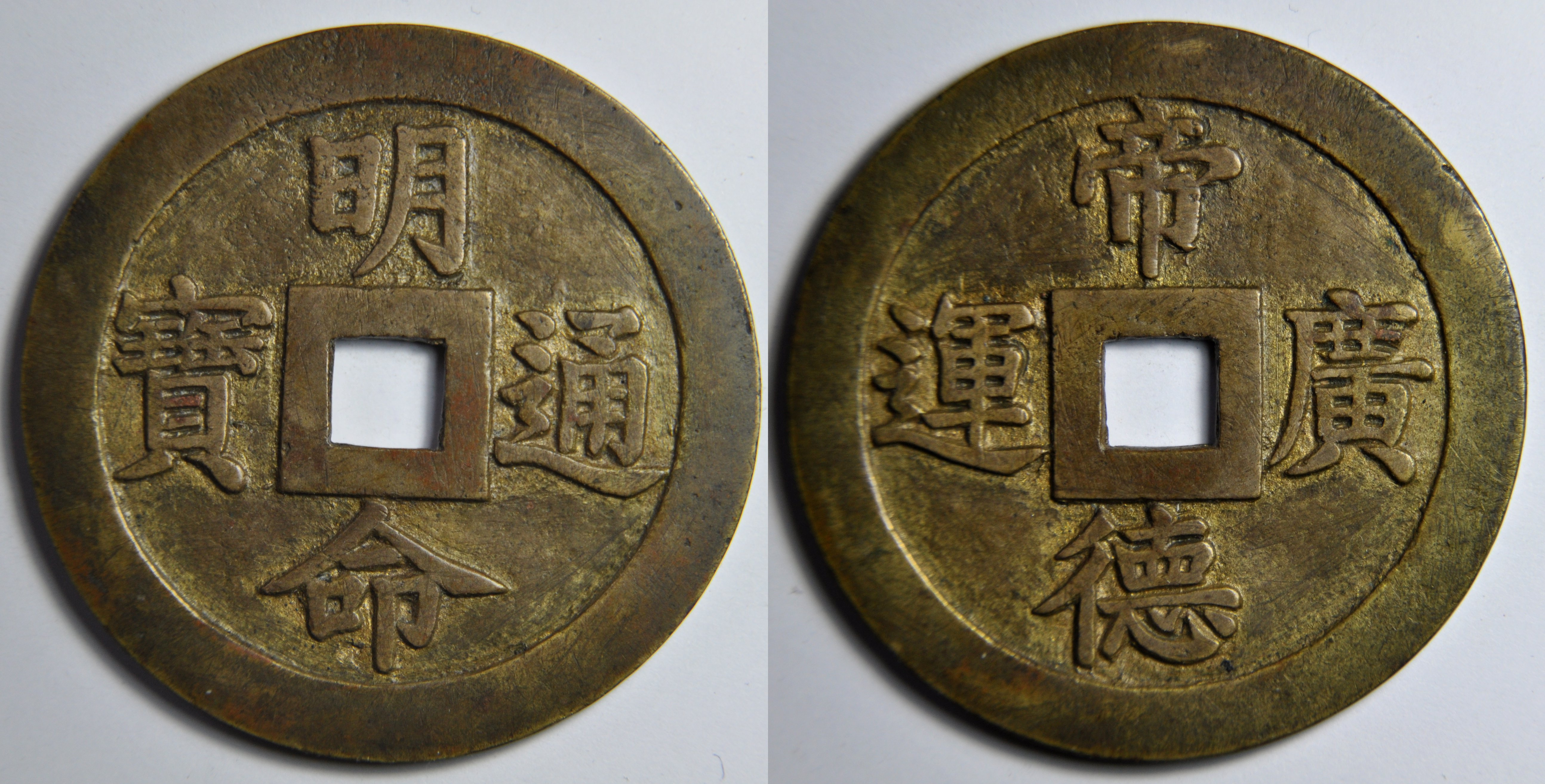
A large brass Minh Mạng Thông Bảo (明命通寶) cash coin of 1 mạch with a Confucian message on it

Under the Nguyễn dynasty era Emperor Minh Mạng large (often 48 millimeters in diameter) presentation coins with the inscription Minh Mạng Thông Bảo (明命通寶) were made that featured inscriptions from the Huainanzi on their reverse, it is believed that this work was chosen because it states that a monarch or ruler should embrace both Confucianism and Taoism and attain sagehood. Because the term Minh Mạng (chữ Hán: 明命) can also be translated as "bright life" or "intelligent decree" the inscription Minh Mạng Thông Bảo is commonly used on Vietnamese numismatic charms.

There are at least seventeen known varieties of this large denomination Minh Mạng Thông Bảo with a four-character inscription and 23 known varieties of the Minh Mạng Thông Bảo with an eight-character inscription.

== Tadpole script charms ==
Some Confucian coin charms have inscriptions written in the tadpole script variety of seal script, these Confucian coin charms convey Confucian messages or the act of honouring one's ancestors through proverbs taken out of old stories. Examples of these coin charms a Chinese numismatic charm with free inscription "bu tan wei bao" (不貪為寶) which translates into English as "not being greedy is a treasure". This Confucian tadpole script coin charm is a reference to a story from the Commentary of Zuo, in this story a peasant came to see Zi Han (子罕, zi hǎn) who was a high level government official of the ancient State of Song. The peasant had found a valuable jade stone of which its value was confirmed by an expert. The peasant wanted to present this piece of jade to Zi Han, but the official had then refused to accept the jade. In response to the stone Zi Han said to the peasant, "You consider the jade to be a treasure while I consider 'not being greedy' to be a treasure" (示玉人，玉人以為寶也，故敢獻之。). Further Zi Han stated that "If I receive the jade, you will have lost your treasure and I, too, will have lost my treasure. It would be better if both of us keep our own personal treasures" (我以不貪為寶，爾以玉為寶，若以與我，皆喪寶也。 不若人有其寶。). The reverse of this coin charm shows sycees and a large number of the Chinese character "tian" (田), which means "field" as in farm land. The sycees represent silver and the Chinese character "tian" represents farm land which was a symbol of wealth in ancient China.

Another example of a Confucian tadpole script coin charm has the obverse inscription qīng bái chuán jiā (清白傳家, "Pureness handed down in the family"), which is a reference to Yang Zhen (样震), a Han dynasty government official and the prefecture governour of Jingzhou who was known for both his erudition and his impeccable moral character. The inscription on this coin is a reference to a story where Yang Zhen while on the way to Jingzhou, had passed through Changyi prefecture (昌邑县). In this prefecture he met an old friend named Wang Mi (王密), who had come out late at night to meet him. As Yang Zhen had appointed Wang Mi as the Changyi prefecture head (昌邑县长), Wang Mi wanted to thank him by giving him catties of gold, in response Yang Zhen had refused the gold. In response to the declined offer Yang Zhen said to Wang Mi, "This old friend knows you but why is it that you do not know your old friend?" (朋友知道你，你為什麼不知道老朋友呢？) To which Wang Mi replied, "It is now the middle of the night, no one will know." (現在是深夜，沒有人會知道。), to which Yang Zhen replied, "Heaven knows, the spirits know, I know and you know. How can you say that no one would know?" (天知、神知、我知、你知，怎麼說沒有人知道呢。), after which Wang Mi departed feeling very ashamed of his words and actions. In this story Yang Zhen felt that an untarnished reputation would be the greatest legacy that he could leave to his descendants and this charm reminds its owner of this sense of Confucian moral integrity.

These "Legacy of an Untarnished Reputation" coin charms first appeared in China during the Song dynasty period and usually have a diameter of 62.5 millimeters, a thickness of 4 millimeters, and they tend to have a weight of 62.9 grams. But specimens are known to have a diameter as large as around 90 millimeters.

== List of Confucian coin charm inscriptions ==
List of Confucian coin charm inscriptions and themes:

List of Confucian coin charm inscriptions
Transliteration	Traditional Chinese	Simplified Chinese	Literal English translation	Meaning	Image
Bu tan wei bao	不貪為寶	不贪为宝	"Not being greedy is a treasure"	A reference to a story from the Commentary of Zuo.	
Fu ci zi xiao	父慈子孝	父慈子孝	"the father is kind and the son is filial."	Filial piety	
Hua e shuang hui	花萼雙輝	花萼双辉	"Petals and sepals both shine."	Hua (花) refers to the colorful petals of a flower. E (萼) are the sepals (or calyx), which are the small green leaf-like parts of a flower located just below the petals. (Note: When the flower is in the bud (or its "early") stage it is the sepals which surround and protect it. In this context "E" (萼) can also refer to a younger brother who helps the elder brother just as the sepals or calyx helps the flower. The extended meaning of these Confucian coin charms is that in the Confucian view of the world, or in Confucian philosophy, a younger brother (or E) acting in his proper filial role shares in the glory of his elder brother, this is a type of Confucian filial piety.)	
Zhilan Yushu	芝蘭玉樹	芝兰玉树	"Irises, orchids and a tree of jade."	A talented young man of noble character. Zhilan (芝蘭) literally translates into the English language as "irises and orchids", but the phrase has the implied (or hidden) meaning of being of "noble character". Yushu (玉樹) literally translates into the English language as a "tree made of jade", but the phrase is commonly used in Mandarin Chinese to describe either a handsome or talented young gentleman. The term "Jade tree" furthermore has the implied meaning of what is called a "scholar tree", which is a laudatory title for male children.	
Guizi Lansun	桂子蘭孫	桂子兰孙	"Cassia seeds and orchid grandsons."	Honourable sons and noble grandsons	
Ronghua Fugui	榮華富貴	荣华富贵	"Glory, wealth, and rank." "High position and great wealth."	An auspicious inscription.	
Zaosheng Guizi	早生貴子	早生贵子	"May you soon give birth to an honourable son."	A wish for the Confucian ideal of having many sons. In Confucian society sons were highly desired because male offspring carried on the family line and they were tasked with performing the ancestor worship rituals.	
Liansheng Guizi	連生貴子	连生贵子	"May there be the birth of one honourable son after another."	A wish for the Confucian ideal of having many sons. In Confucian society sons were highly desired because male offspring carried on the family line and they were tasked with performing the ancestor worship rituals.	
Tengwen Qifeng	騰蛟起鳳	腾蛟起凤	"A dragon soaring and a fenghua dancing."	A phrase found in this excerpt from one of Wang Bo's poems: 十旬休假, 勝友如雲; 千里逢迎,高朋滿座。 騰蛟起鳳, 孟學士之詞宗; 紫電青霜, 王將軍之武庫。 家君作宰, 路出名區; 童子何知, 躬逢勝餞 Translation: On this official holiday, which falls on every tenth day, good friends gather together, and a galaxy of distinguished guests from distant places fill the hall. Also present at the gathering, are Master Meng, whose literary grace is as imposing as a dragon soaring and a phoenix dancing, and the General Wang, who has weapons as sharp as the famous swords “Purple Lightning” and “Blue Frost” in his armory. I, as an immature and young man, have the good fortune to take part in this grand banquet on my journey to visit my father, who is a magistrate of a county. The expression used in this context refers to a person having either an exceptional literary or an exceptional artistic talent.	
Zidian Qingshuang	紫電青霜	紫电青霜	"Purple Lightning and Blue Frost."	A phrase found in an excerpt of Wang Bo's poem, In this poem the swords in General Wang's arsenal are compared to "Purple Lightning and Blue Frost", which were swords of Sun Quan.	
Qinse Youzhi	琴瑟友之	琴瑟友之	"With the qin and the se be friendly to her." "The qin and se zithers warm her heart."	The expression comes from a poem named "Cry of the Ospreys" (關雎), found in the Classic of Poetry. The "Cry of the Ospreys" celebrates the giving of birth to many offspring.	
Zhongsi Yanqing	螽斯衍慶	螽斯衍庆	"May your children be as numerous as grasshoppers."	Grasshopper were viewed as a symbol of fertility and procreation im traditional Chinese society, especially among the traditional Confucianist families that tended to wish for numerous male offspring and grandsons that will further continue the ancestral (blood) lineage, and are tasked to carry out the religious duties ancestor worship.	
Yi chu fei fu Boo ciowan	義出肺腑 ᠪᠣᠣ ᠴᡳᠣᠸᠠᠨ	义出肺腑 ᠪᠣᠣ ᠴᡳᠣᠸᠠᠨ	"Righteousness comes from the bottom of one's heart." "Ministry of Revenue Mint"	The Confucian concept of "righteousness" (義). The Ministry of Revenue	
Jing xiong ai di	敬兄愛第	敬兄爱第	"Revere older brothers and love younger brothers."	Filial piety	
Qing bai chuan jia	清白傳家	清白传家	"Pureness handed down in the family"	A reference to Yang Zhen (样震), a Han dynasty government official and the prefecture governour of Jingzhou who was known for both his erudition and his impeccable moral character.	
Qilin Songzi	麒麟送子	麒麟送子	"The qilin (Chinese unicorn) delivers sons."	A wish for more male offspring.	
Junfu Zichen	君父子臣	君父子臣	"Prince, father, son, minister."	This inscription refers to "The Analects" (論語) by Confucius. This phrase Confucius writes about the "rectification of names" and notes that a "good government" is a state of governance when "the Prince is the Prince", "the Minister is the Minister", "the father is the father", and "the son is the son" where everyone has a role to fulfil.	
Tianxian Songzi	天仙送子	天仙送子	"Celestial beings (who have attained to purity) deliver sons."	A wish for more male offspring.	
Yong'an Wunan	永安五男	永安五男	"Perpetual peace to five sons."	A peaceful existence of one's five male offspring.	
Wunan Ernu	五男二女	五男二女	"Five sons and two daughters."	The Confucian ideal number and sexes of offspring.	
Baizi Qiansun	百子千孫	百子千孙	"A hundred sons and a thousand grandsons."	A wish for male offspring.	
Qianzi Wansun	千子萬孫	千子万孙	"A thousand sons and ten thousand grandsons."	A wish for male offspring.	
Qicai Zilu	妻財子祿	妻财子禄	"Wife, wealth, sons, and emolument."	A wish for male offspring.	
Zisun Wandai	子孫萬代	子孙万代	"Sons and grandsons 10,000 generations."	A wish for male offspring.	
Duozi Duosun	多子多孫	多子多孙	"Many sons and many grandsons."	A wish for male offspring.	

== Sources ==
- Amulets of Vietnam by Craig Greenbaum. Published: 2006. Retrieved: 23 February 2020.
- Edgar J.Mandel. Metal Charms and Amulets of China.
