= Horse coin =

Type of Chinese numismatic charm

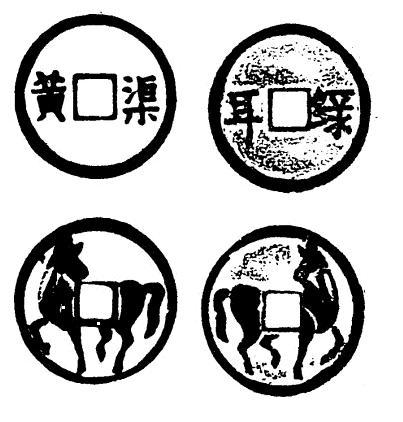
Illustrations of Chinese horse coins depicting "Great Yellow" and "Green Ear"

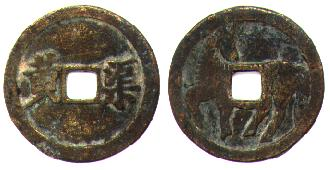
A horse coin with the inscription "Ch'u Huang" (The Great Yellow Horse)

Horse coins (Traditional Chinese: 馬錢; Simplified Chinese: 马钱; Pinyin: mǎ qián), alternatively dama qian (打馬錢), are a type of Chinese numismatic charm that originated in the Song dynasty (or as early as the Tang dynasty) and presumed to have been used as gambling tokens. Although many literary figures wrote about these coins their usage has always been failed to be mentioned by them. Most horse coins tend to be round coins, 3 centimetres (1.2 in) in diameter with a circular or square hole in the middle of the coin. The horses featured on horse coins are depicted in various positions such as lying asleep on the ground, turning their head while neighing, or galloping forward with their tails rising high. it is currently unknown how horse coins were actually used though it is speculated that Chinese horse coins were actually used as game board pieces or gambling counters. Horse coins are most often manufactured from copper or bronze, but in a few documented cases they may also be made from animal horns or ivory. The horse coins produced during the Song dynasty are considered to be those of the best quality and craftsmanship and tend be made from better metal than the horse coins produced after. Some horse coins would feature the name of the famous horses they depicted. It is estimated that there are over three hundred variants of the horse coin. Some horse coins contained only an image of a horse while others also included an image of the rider and others had inscriptions which identify the horse or rider. During the beginning of the year of the horse in 2002 Chinese researchers Jian Ning and Wang Liyan of the National Museum of Chinese History wrote articles on horse coins in the China Cultural Relics Newspaper, noting that they found it a pity that the holes in the coins covered the saddles of the horses as this could have revealed more about ancient horse culture. Horse coins from the Song dynasty are the horse coins that are produced at the highest quality while horse coins from subsequent dynasties tend to be inferior compared to them.

Horse coins often depicted famous horses from Chinese history or famous horses from Chinese mythology, while commemorative horse coins would also feature riders, such as the horse coin that features “General Yue Yi of the State of Yan” commemorating the event that a Yan general attempted to conquer the city of Jimo. Another horse coin depicts the Chinese mythological horse long ju (龍駒), this horse was first mentioned in the "Rites of Zhou". The Rites of Zhou describes a "dragon colt" as a horse which is "more than 8 chi (尺) tall" when its measured from its front hoof to the shoulder. One chi, during the Zhou dynasty period, was about 16.5 centimeters in the metric system.

It is rare for horse coins to also feature images of horses in armour but a few rare examples from the Song dynasty exist (and it is even rarer for these coins to also feature a saddle) as well as some from the Mongol Yuan dynasty that feature horses wearing typical Mongolian horse armour. As horse coins from the Yuan dynasty are extremely rare there has not been much research undertaken in determining their usage and origins.

== Names ==
Horse coins are referred to in Mandarin Chinese as either maqian (馬錢) or dama qian (打馬錢).

When horse coins are used as game pieces they are referred to as dama geqian (traditional Chinese: 打馬格錢; simplified Chinese: 打马格钱; pinyin: dǎ mǎ gé qián) and when they are used as gambling pieces they are referred to as dama boxi (traditional Chinese: 打馬博戲; simplified Chinese: 打马博戏; pinyin: dǎ mǎ bó xì).

== Categorisation ==
While there are many known varieties of horse coins, they can generally be categorised into three basic types based on their design.

- The first type depicts a picture of the horse on one side of the horse coin and the inscription identifying the horse written down on the other side of the coin.
- The second type has both the image of the horse as well as the inscription depicted on the same side of the coin with the reverse side being left blank.
- The third type, which is the most rarest of types, has the identical picture of the horse as well as the inscription on both sides of the coin (traditional Chinese: 合背錢; simplified Chinese: 合背钱; pinyin: hé bèi qián).

== Horse coins carved into cash coins ==
On the island of Java it was sometimes done to take an existing circulating cash coin, for example a Kan'ei Tsūhō (寛永通寳) cash coin, and engrave the design of a horse coin into it. The Javanese also did this with other designs.

== Ferghana horse coins ==
Ferghana horse coins, also known as Sweating blood horse coins (traditional Chinese: 汗血寶馬錢; simplified Chinese: 汗血宝马钱; pinyin: hàn xiě bǎo mǎ qián) or Akhal-Teke horse coins, are a type of horse coin that feature Ferghana horses. References to Ferghana horses have been traced back as far as the reign of Emperor Wu of the Han dynasty. Ferghana horse coins don't include references to specific Ferghana horse, rather they display imagery and inscriptions used to represent the entire breed. Ferghana horse coins date back to the Song dynasty.

These horse coins display the image of a Ferghana horse with two Traditional Chinese characters hàn xiě (汗血) which translates into English as "sweats blood".

=== Rare specimens of Ferghana horse coins ===
Only a single specimen of a Ferghana horse coin with an identical obverse and reverse design (合背錢) dating to the Song dynasty is known to exist, it is 31 mm (1.2 inches) in diameter. This coin was previously known to be in the collection of Mr. Wei Yutian (traditional Chinese: 衛玉田; simplified Chinese: 卫玉田; pinyin: wèi yù tián, 1854–1937) and was sold at the Xiling Yinshe Auction Co., Ltd. (西泠印社拍卖有限公司) 2017 Spring Auction for US$1,580 (or about 10,350 RMB).

== List of horse coins ==
List of types of horse coins depicting famous horses:

List of variants of horse coins
Transliteration	Traditional Chinese	Simplified Chinese	Literal English translation	Obverse image	Reverse image
Qin jiang san qi	秦將散騎	秦将散骑	"Followers of General Bai Qi"		
Yan jiang yue yi	燕將樂毅	燕将乐毅	"General Yue Yi of the State of Yan" (Note: The name is sometimes alternatively translated as "General Le Yi of the State of Yan".)		
Piao niao	驃嫋	骠袅	"Fast and slender"		
Wu zhui	烏騅	乌骓	"Black spotted horse"		
Tang jiang qian li	唐將千里	唐将千里	"Tang General 1,000 li"		
Zhen guan shi ji Jue bo	貞觀十驥 決波	贞观十骥 决波	"Ten thoroughbreds of Zhen Guan" (Note: Zhen Guan was the era name used by Emperor Taizong of the Tang dynasty.) "Bursting as a wave"		
Qian li	千里	千里	"1,000 li"		
Qian li zhi ma	千里之馬	千里之马	"1,000 li horse"		
Long ju	龍駒	龙驹	"Dragon's Colt"		
Da-Song Jinqian; Song Qi	大宋金錢 宋騎	大宋金钱 宋骑	"Great Song (dynasty) metal money" "A rider of the Song (dynasty)"		
Ying gong zhu han	英公朱汗	英公朱汗	"Duke of Ying, Red sweat"		
Shanzi	山子	山子	"Child of the mountains"		
Han Xie	汗血	汗血	"Sweats blood"		
Zhao jiang lian po	趙將廉頗	赵将廉颇	"Followers of General Lian Po"		
King Mu of Western Zhou's horses ("The eight outstanding steeds") (Note: King Mu of Zhou had once rode on a chariot with eight horses that were known as the "eight outstanding steeds". The names of these eight horses can be found on Chinese and other East Asian horse coins although there is some disagreement as to which set of eight names which were passed down through history is the correct version. The names of King Mu of Zhou's eight horses described their outstanding characteristics and included "Beyond Earth", "Rush by Night", "Windswept Plumes", "Finer than Flashing Light", "Faster than Shadow", "Wing Bearer", "Faster than Light", and "Rising Mist". Other historical Chinese texts list King Mu of Zhou's horses as "Bay Steed", "Smoked Ebony", "Skewbald Chestnut", "Great Yellow", and "Green Ear".)
Qu Huang	渠黃	渠黄	"Great Yellow"		
Qu Huang zhi ma	渠黃之馬	渠黄之马	"The Great Yellow horse"		
Lü Er	綠耳	绿耳	"Green ear"		
Jue Di	絕地	绝地	"Beyond Earth"		
Ben Xiao	奔宵	奔宵	"Rush by Night"		
Fan Yu	翻羽	翻羽	"Windswept Plumes"		
			"Finer than Flashing Light"		
Chao Ying	超影	超影	"Faster than Shadow"		
Xie Yi	挾翼	挟翼	"Wing Bearer"		
Chao Guang	超光	超光	"Faster than Light"		
Teng Wu	騰霧	腾雾	"Rising Mist"		
			"Bay Steed"		
Dao Li	盜驪	盗骊	"Smoked Ebony"	uncertain	
Chi Ji	赤驥	赤骥	"Skewbald Chestnut"	uncertain	

== Sources ==
- THIERRY, François, "Les monnaies au cheval, maqian ou damaqian", Bulletin de la Société Française de Numismatique, juin 1991, n°6, pp. 122–126 (in French).
