= Japanese numismatic charm =

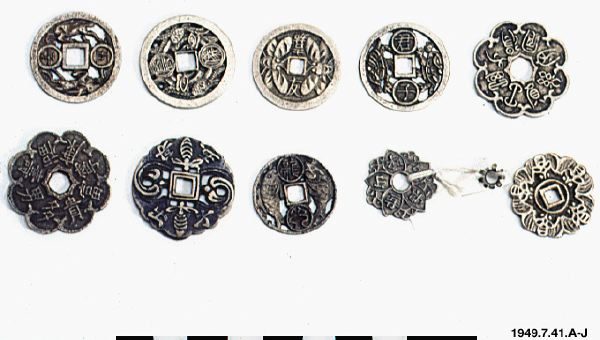
Japanese coin-like amulets on display at the Museum of Ethnography, Sweden

Japanese numismatic charms (Japanese: 絵銭 or 画銭), also known as Japanese amulets, Japanese talismans, or simply Japanese charms, are a family of cash coin-like and other numismatic-inspired types of charms that like the Korean and Vietnamese variants are derived from Chinese numismatic charms (also referred to as Yansheng coins or huāqián), but have evolved around the customs of the Japanese culture. Although most of these charms resemble Japanese cash coins and the amulet coins of China, they contain their own categories unique to Japan. In the case of these coins, "charm" in this context is a catchall term for coin-shaped items which were not official (or counterfeit) money. However, these numismatic objects were not all necessarily considered "magical" or "lucky", as some of these Chinese numismatic charms can be used as "mnemonic coins".

== Kokuji charms ==
Japanese numismatic charms can include characters never used on any official coins such as Kokuji, which is a national script unique to Japan similar to Gukja in Korea or Chữ Nôm in Vietnam, these charms, with the pronunciation sa mu ha ra ( , さ・む・は・ら), were usually given by village elders to soldiers when they left to fight in the Second Sino-Japanese War and World War II, currently these charms are being used by travellers for supposed protection and are usually sold by shops at shrines. These charms serve a similar function as Saint Christopher medals do in the Western world.

According to the article published in the August 1992 issue of the Japanese magazine "Collections" (收集), a number of Kokuji charms were created in the year 1937 (Shōwa 12) by the director of the Japan Mint to be used as a kind of protective amulet. The design of these Kokuji amulets resembles the base of the canon emplacements that were used in the past to protect the shores of Japan from hostile pirate ships. During World War II, it was further customary for some Japanese people to write Kokuji on a piece of paper and then attach the inscription to the roofs of their houses. This was done in the belief that the paper Kokuji amulets would protect them from incendiary bombs dropped by the allied forces, such as the United States, during the war.

== Japanese numismatic Buddhist charms ==
Japanese numismatic Buddhist charms are Buddhist charms often shaped like cash coins and bear inscriptions asking various figures from the Buddhist faith for blessings or protection, these inscriptions typically have a legend like "大佛鐮倉" ("(The) Great Buddha of Kamakura"). The Buddhist "且空藏棄" Japanese numismatic charm cast during the years 1736–1740 in Japan during the Tokugawa shogunate dedicated to the Ākāśagarbha Bodhisattva based on one of the favourite mantras of Kūkai is frequently found in China. Ākāśagarbha one of the 8 immortals who attempts to free people from the cycle of reincarnation with compassion. These coins were brought to China in large numbers by Japanese Buddhist monks, another Japanese Buddhist charm frequently found in China has the inscription "南無阿彌陀佛" ("I put my trust in (the) Amitābha Buddha").

There is a variant Daruma doll which features Bodhidharma, the founder of Zen Buddhism, holding a Northern Wei dynasty period Taihe Wuzhu (太和五銖, tài hé wǔ zhū) cash coin.

== Inari Ōkami charms ==
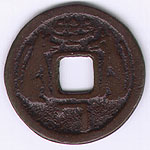
An Inari Ōkami charm

Inari Ōkami charms depict Inari Ōkami, the Japanese kami of foxes, of fertility, rice, tea and sake, of agriculture and industry, of general prosperity and worldly success, and one of the principal kami of Shinto. Inari may be represented by the image of a fox or a pair of foxes, hence these amulets are known as "Japanese fox charms". On some Inari Ōkami charms a pair of foxes are depicted standing before a plate of "tama" jewels. The tama in this context refers to both Inari Ōkami and to the worldy benefits, such as wealth, which the kami has to offer. On the bottom of these amulets is a depiction of a traditional Japanese warehouse key, in reference to the key that is used to unlock the treasure house of Inari Ōkami. It is suspected that these fox charms were carried around by worshippers of Inari Ōkami in their purses in the hope of accumulating riches of wealth. Another Inari Ōkami charm has the inscription "Fushimi" in reference to the largest Inari Ōkami shrine in Japan, which is located south of the city of Kyoto. These Japanese fox charms have the reverse inscription "raising the kingpost", and the reverse outer rim of these amulets state "Happiness in all the more than 60 provinces of Japan". Because the inscription makes a reference to the construction of a building it might have been used as a gift to people that have contributed money to the rebuilding a shrine.

== Ebisu and Daikokuten charms ==
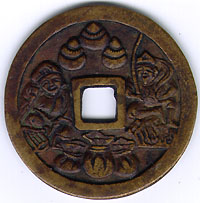
An Ebisu and Daikokuten charm depicting the pair sitting next to three bags of money

Ebishu and Daikokuten charms depict two of the Seven Lucky Gods. Namely Ebishu, the Japanese god of fishermen and luck, and Daikokuten, the Japanese god of great darkness or blackness, or the god of five cereals. On these numismatic charms Ebisu is depicted holding a fishing pole with a freshly caught sea bream, and Daikokuten always depicted as sitting on large bales of rice.

== Minatogawa Shrine souvenirs ==
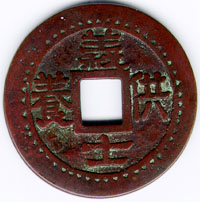
A Gishi Kuyō souvenir token issued by the Minatogawa Shrine, in Chūō-ku, Kobe

During the Meiji period the Minatogawa Shrine, in Chūō-ku, Kobe, began to issue souvenirs that resemble cash coins. These souvenirs have the inscription Gishi Kuyō, which translates into English as "Offerings to the Spirits of the Righteous Warriors". The term Gishi refers to a "righteous warriors" which is mainly used to refer to soldiers that have fought in the name of the Emperor of Japan. These souvenirs continued to be produced into the 20th century.

== Other categories ==
- Marriage coin charm
- Open-work charm
