= Open-work charm =

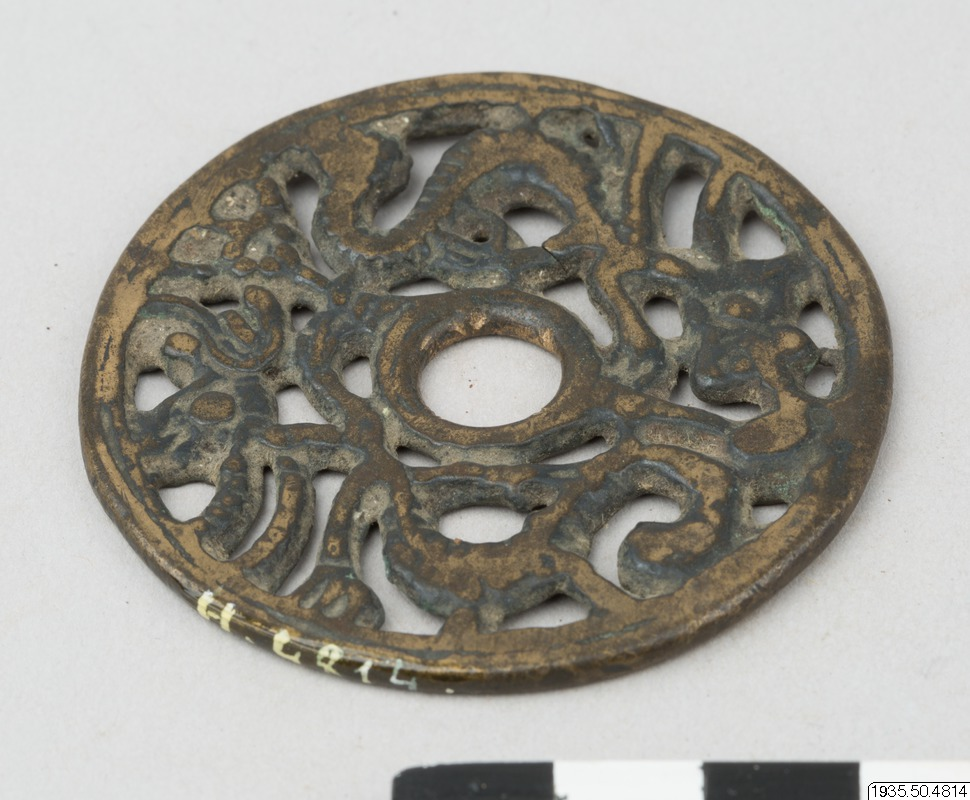
A Chinese open-work charm on display at the Museum of Ethnography, Sweden

Open-work charms (simplified Chinese: 镂空钱 / 玲珑钱; traditional Chinese: 鏤空錢 / 玲瓏錢; pinyin: lòu kōng qián / líng lóng qián; lit. 'hollowed out money / elegant money') are a type of Chinese, Japanese, Korean, and Vietnamese numismatic charms characterised by irregularly shaped "holes" or "openings" between their design elements known as openwork. The design of the amulets represent yin while the holes represent yang and their general purpose was to attract good fortune and ward off evil spirits and misfortune. Unlike most other types of Chinese numismatic charms which usually tend to have square center holes if they are holed, open-work charms tend to almost exclusively have round center holes though open-work charms with square center holes are known to exist and certain thematic open-work charms that feature human-made constructions mostly told to have square holes. Another distinctive feature of open-work charms is that they are almost purely based on illustrative imagery and only a small minority of them contain legends written in hanzi (Chinese characters). While most other forms of Chinese numismatic charms are made from brass, open-work charms are predominantly made from bronze.

Japanese open-work charms (known as E-sen) tend to be inferior in quality and are easily distinguishable from the rest.

Open-work charms were primarily used by women and children and were seen to bedclothes and sedan chairs as well as hung in cupboards.

Unlike most types of other Chinese numismatic charms open-work charms do not have a large overlap with other types, but some Chinese Boy charms are also open-work charms and resemble any other "normal" open-work charms but have a statuette of a boy sitting or crouching on top of the "coin".

== History ==
Open-work charms were originally first cast under the reign of the Han dynasty, but a large number of the ones from this era are mostly just small fractions taken from other utensils made from metal. During the Song, Mongol Yuan, and Ming dynasties open-work charms were popularly used as dress ornaments for the adornment of the wearer. During the Ming dynasty open-work charms with themes of buildings and temples were primarily made in the Yunnanese city of Dali. By the time of the Manchu Qing dynasty open-work charms seemed to have become less popular, unlike earlier open-work charms those produced during the Qing dynasty tend to be yellow in colour as opposed to the earlier brown ones due to the switch from bronze to brass.

== Categories of open-work charms ==
=== Fundamental or "basic" categories ===
There are 4 fundamental divisions or "categories", one based on animals (including mythological animals such as dragons, qilin, and fenghuang), one based on humans and human-like figures such as Taoist immortals, but can also use people to demonstrate a scene such as the illustration of filial piety from Confucianism, a category of open-work charms that depict plants, and finally a category that depicts man-made constructions such as temples and other types of buildings.

=== Table of themes of open-work charms ===
Theme	Image
Open-work charms with immortals and people	
Dragon open-work charms	
Phoenix open-work charms	
Peacock open-work charms	
Chinese Unicorn open-work charms	
Bat open-work charms	
Lotus open-work charms	
Flower and Vine open-work charms	
Open-work charms with buildings and temples (Note: Most of the open-work charms depicting buildings and temples are believed to have been cast in the city of Dali, Yunnan during the Ming dynasty.)	
Fish open-work charms	
Deer open-work charms	
Lion open-work charms	
Tiger open-work charms	
Rabbit open-work charms	
Bird open-work charms	
Crane open-work charms	
Horse open-work charms	

== Examples of symbolism in the different themes ==
The ancient Chinese people believed that charms and amulets with certain symbols on them could attract good luck and protect them from all fortune and malicious spirits; for this reason many open-work charms display themes from Chinese folklore, religion, and Chinese mythology as well have other depictions that are ascribed to have auspicious abilities in Chinese symbolism.

"The occult powers ascribed in China in all times and ages to charms and spells may be said to have no limit. It puts in the foreront an important tenet: Words are no idle sounds, characters or penstrokes are not mere ink or paint, but they constitute or produce the reality which they represent. And whereas any desired magical effect may be expressed in word or writing, charms and spells can {a}ffect everything."

— H.A. Ramsden

Open-work charms are also known to have Buddhist, Confucianist, or Taoist design elements and may portray both figures and concepts from those religions. Open-work charms may also feature a combination of various symbols such as lotus flowers and fish or dragons and fenghuang on the same charm.

=== Bats ===
Several open-work charms feature bats. This is because bats could be interpreted as a rebus for "good luck" as the Mandarin Chinese word for "bat" (蝠, fú) sounds like the Mandarin Chinese word for "good luck" (福, fú). An example of a Chinese open-work charm with a bat design that was quite popular during the Ming and Qing dynasties would be one where five bats surrounded the Hanzi character for "longevity" (壽). This open-work charm is a play on the popular Chinese saying "five fortunes surround longevity" (五福捧壽, wǔ fú pěng shòu).

=== Confucian filial piety ===
Some Chinese open-work charms depict the concept of filial piety from Confucianism, for example there is an open-work charm which displays four stories from "The Twenty-Four Examples of Filial Piety", in these stories examples are given of how children should obey their parents and respect the elderly which are all central themes of Confucianism. These open-work charms are also part of a larger family of Confucian charms.

=== Dragons ===
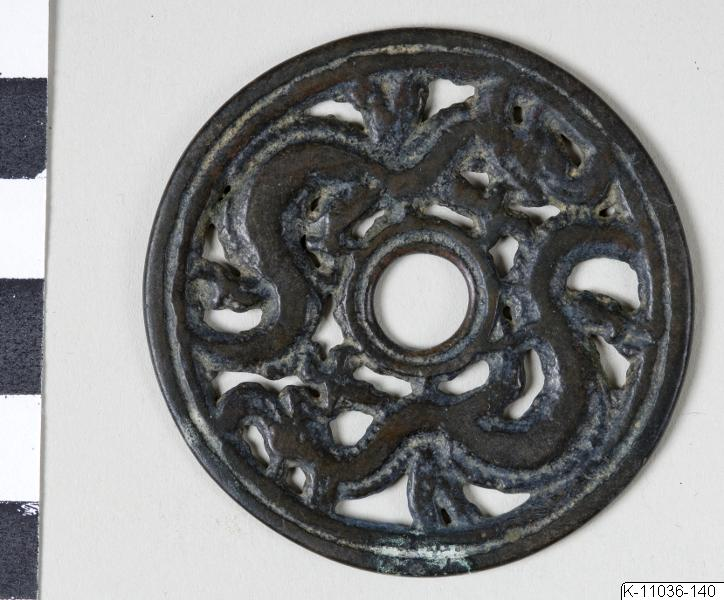
A Chinese open-work charm depicting two dragons chasing each other's tails on display at the Museum of Ethnography, Sweden

Chinese dragons are often used as a theme for open-work charms with the vast majority of dragon themed open-work charms depicting two dragon, while amulets with a single dragon are less frequently seen. An example of an open-work charm with only a single Chinese dragon has the dragon is facing left with its head located just to the left of central hole. The neck of the dragon is shaped like an "S" while its body is coiled upwards of its head. Unlike other Chinese numismatic charms which depict two seasons, open-work charms that depict two Chinese dragons rarely have them face each other but more often have them chase each others tails. In many cases the two dragons appear to be fighting over a pearl which could be the wish-granting pearl from the Chinese eight treasures.

Open-work charms that depict two dragons chasing each other head to tail are the most commonly found design. The reason for this is because dragons are immune to magic spells and cannot be harmed by them.

=== Fenghuang ===
Open-work charms depicting fenghuang are much less commonly seen than those that depict Chinese dragons. Fenghuang in Chinese mythology are symbols of "peace" and "joy", as fenghuang are seen as a symbol of yin they tend to have tail feathers in even numbers (as even numbers represent yin while odd numbers represent yang). Open-work charms that display fenghuang also tend to be on the larger side (for example 58 millimeters in diameter) and also being both thick and heavy. In Buddhism the fenghuang is considered to be a symbol of goodness because it eats no living thing; for this reason, open-work charms depicting fenghuang were commonly worn by Buddhists.

=== Flowers and vines ===
Chinese open-work charms that display imagery of flowers and vines usually display peony trees blooming. The peony could symbolise various things. One symbolism of the peony flower is that it stands for rebellion and resistance where it is associated with the story of Empress Wu Zetian drinking at winter time while she was in the Imperial Flower Garden. As she was admiring the snow, the story tells that she was also intrigued by the smell of the winter flowers that were in bloom that day. As the story goes the Empress wrote a poem and sent it to the Chinese god that was in charge of flowers. In the poem the Empress said that she would come to the garden again after one day and that all the flowers there were to bloom and were not to wait until springtime. The next morning all flowers were in bloom, except for the peony, which stubbornly disobeyed the order. Wu Zetian was enraged and allegedly gave the order that all the peonies in Chang'an were to be banished, while those peony trees that refused her order would be burned to a crisp. Over time the reputation of the flower changed and peonies became a symbol for longevity, everlasting physical beauty, loyalty, and being happy. Peonies could also be used to symbolise wealth as the way they grow resembles strings of cash coins.

=== Humans and fish ===
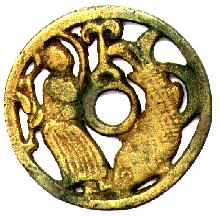
An open-work charm depicting a person on the left side and a fish on the right

There is an ancient open work-charm which depicts either a man or a woman fishing. The human is on the right side of the charm while the fish on the left. The fish symbolises prosperity because the Mandarin Chinese word for fish (魚, yú) is a visual pun for "abundance" or "well-to-do" (余, yú or 裕, yù). The fish on this open-work charm also alludes to an allegory of a carp leaping over the Dragon Gate to become a mythical Chinese dragon (鯉魚跳龍門) which is used to illustrate that persistently investing effort is needed to overcome an obstacle. In this context, it alludes to the case of those who wish to move up the ranks as officials in the imperial examination system. Another possible hidden meaning of this same open-work charm is that the human represented in the coin may in fact be female. The Mandarin Chinese word for "woman" (婦, fù) could be used as a homophonic pun for the Mandarin Chinese word for "wealth" (富, fù). And as the Mandarin Chinese word for "fish" is a pun for "abundance", the hidden or implied meaning of the depicted images on this open-work charm is an abundance of wealth.

=== Lions ===
Open-work charms that depict lions often have two lions playing with some form of treasure (雙獅戲寶, shuāng shī xì bǎo) with one lion being above and one lion being below, the treasure they’re playing with could be a Chinese cash coin which symbolises "wealth". Because the Mandarin Chinese word for "lion" (獅, shī) sounds like the Mandarin Chinese word for "master" or "teacher" (師, shī) which could be seen as a reference to the Zhou dynasty government title of "senior grand tutor" (太師, tài shī), which was the highest civil official. For this reason an open-work charm depicting two lions and a cash coin could symbolise the wish for high ranks and wealth to be passed down from one generation to the next.

=== Lotus ===
Open-work charms that feature the design of a lotus according to Buddhist tradition symbolise a detachment from worldly cares due to the manner the flower which is perceived to be beautiful to emerge from the pond's muck. Due to the fact that the lotus flower has two different names in Mandarin Chinese, namely "蓮花" (lián huā) and "荷花" (hé huā), the first character of the former can be used as a homophonic pun with the word "continuous" (連, lián) while the latter could be used to represent the word "harmony" (和, hé) creating a visual pun for "continuous harmony" (連和, lián hé).

Variants of these lotus charms that depict a lotus pod filled with seeds could also be worn in the hopes that they will improve fertility as the Mandarin Chinese word for "lotus seed" (蓮籽, lián zǐ) could be used as a metaphor for the "continuous birth of children" (連子, lián zi).

=== Pavilions or temples ===
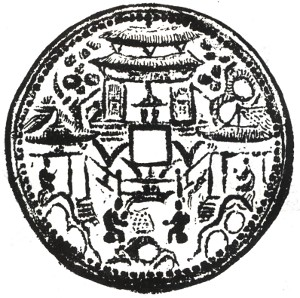
An illustration of an open-work charm with this design

Open-work charms depicting pavilions and temples first started appearing during the Song dynasty, and the majority of these are thought to have been manufactured in the city of Dali. An example of an open-work charm with a pavilion in its design possibly depicts the "Temple of Confucius", within the pavilion of this charm musician is seen playing the guqin while outside of the building two men are seen playing weiqi. Outside of the pavilion bamboo plants and longevity stones could be seen. It is believed that the people in this charm represent Confucius himself.

An alternative hypothesis proposes that rather than being a representation of a temple of Confucius with the statue of the philosopher in front of whom four scholars gather, it is a representation of the Emperor of China seated facing south in the Ming Dang, with the four great officials called the "Columns of the Empire" (si guozhu).

=== Peacocks ===
Open-work charms that depict peacocks are generally believed to have been cast in what today is the province of Yunnan at the time of the Song dynasty, as peacocks are native to the rainforests of this region many indigenous peoples there (such as the Dai) use them as inspiration for their styles of dance and art. Like with many other open-work charms that depict animals those that depict peacocks display them in pairs, peacocks represent a desire for peace and prosperity and may also be used to represent fertility as the ancient Chinese people believed that a single glance from a peacock could impregnate a human woman. Peacocks displayed in pairs on open-work charms symbolise an affectionate couple that fly side-by-side in love with each other.

=== People, immortals, and deities ===
An example of an open-work charm depicting a Chinese immortal and several animals believed to bring "good luck" is one that contains the immortal associated with longevity Xiwangmu holding a Ruyi sceptre standing besides a deer and a tortoise, both of these are associated with longevity as well with the deer having an extra association with wealth and attaining a high rank because the Mandarin Chinese word for "deer" (鹿, lù) sounds like the Mandarin Chinese term for "the salary of a government official" (祿, lù). Above the tortoise there is an "auspicious cloud" (祥雲) which is located just below the round center hole, clouds on Chinese numismatic charms are associated with good fortune because they’re a homophonic pun (or rebus) for "luck" (運, yùn). This open-work-charm also features a crane which like the other animals and Xiwangmu is a symbol for longevity.

=== Qilin ===
Chinese open-work charms that depict the Qilin symbolise a wish for good fortune, longevity, charity, prosperity, and for benevolences to befall the wearer. Qilins are depicted as having a dragon-like head and a deer-like body but with scales instead of fur.

=== Two people and a fish ===
There is a rare open-work charm which illustrates two males standing across from each other with a fish facing the right at the bottom of the charm and a battle shield between the tops of the two men at the top. The traditional explanation of the depicted scene and its hidden meaning is that it shows people doing intense labour hoping that it will bring them prosperity. An alternative explanation is that this charm actually depicts the Chu–Han Contention (楚漢相爭); in this interpretation the two men are fighting each other and the stances they take are hostile positions of two soldiers using their fists, while the fish in this interpretation represents the river where the battle occurred.

=== Young couples falling in love ===
Some open-work charms (which were usually manufactured in Dali, Yunnan) depict young heterosexual couples displaying affection to each other in a form of courtship. The young female is often seen carrying flowers while the top of these open-work charms features crescent moons and clouds, while the male figure often points at the moon with his left hand. These images form a visualisation of the ancient Chinese saying "to be in front of the flowers and under the moon" (花前月下, huā qián yuè xià). These open-work charms are also a part of the family of Chinese marriage charms.
