= Vietnamese numismatic charm =

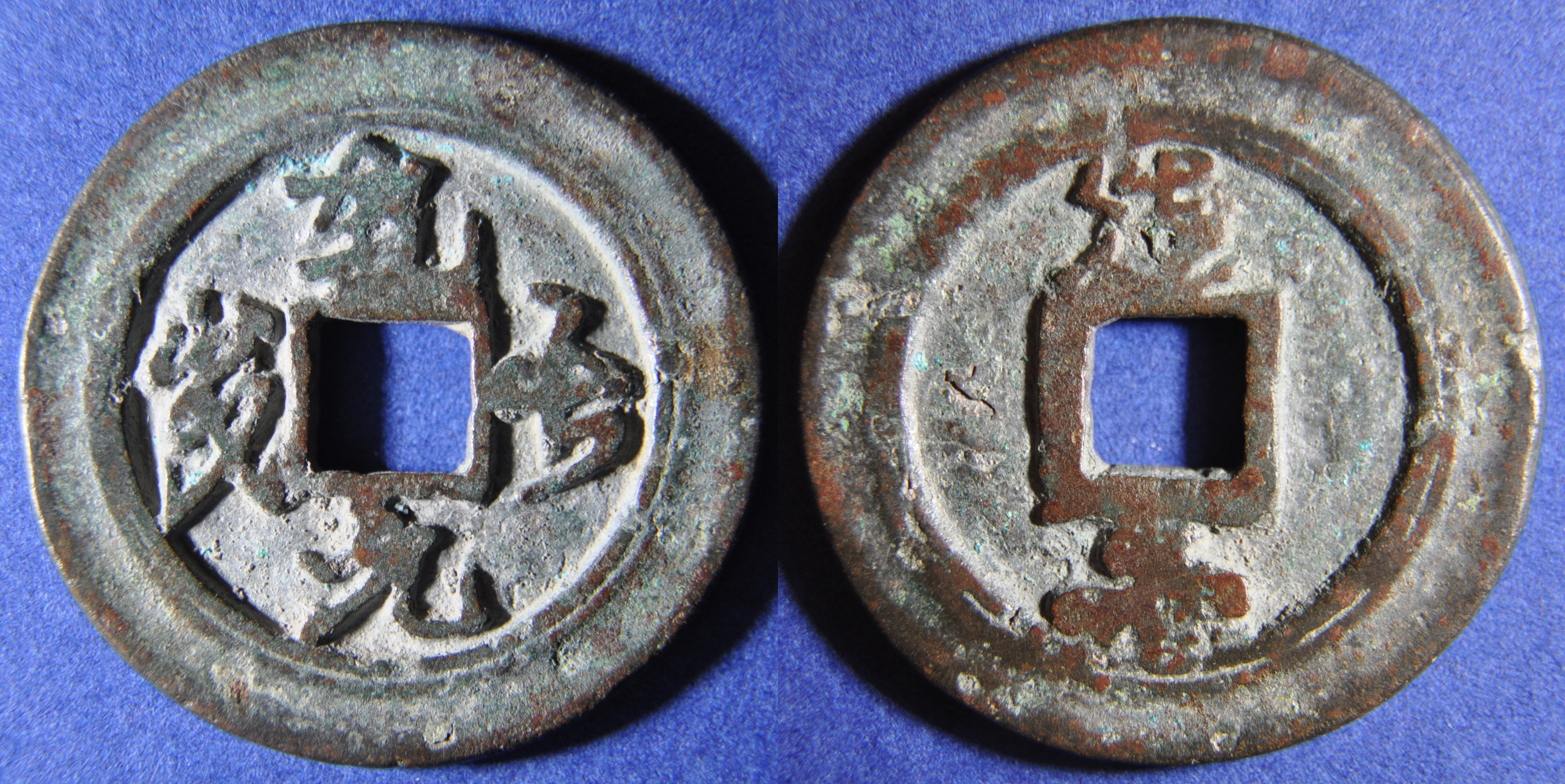
A Vietnamese amulet that resembles a cash coin

Vietnamese numismatic charms (Vietnamese: Bùa Việt Nam; chữ Hán: 越南符銭; chữ Nôm: 符越南), also known as Vietnamese amulets, Vietnamese talismans, or simply Vietnamese charms, are a family of cash coin-like and other numismatic-inspired types of charms that like the Japanese and Korean variants are derived from Chinese numismatic charms (also referred to as Yansheng coins or huāqián), but have evolved around the customs of the Vietnamese culture. Most of these charms resemble Vietnamese cash coins and the amulet coins of China. These "coins" were used at temples, as tokens within the imperial palace, and as everyday charms with supposed magical power such as having the ability to curse evil spirits and bogies. Some of these charms contained the inscriptions of real circulating cash coins but with added imagery.

Inscriptions on Vietnamese numismatic charms can be written in Chữ Hán, Taoist "magic" writing, Devanagari, pseudo-Devanagari, Chữ Nôm, and Latin scripts. Common inscriptions include Trường Mạng Phú Quý (長命富貴), Chính Đức Thông Bảo (正德通寶), and Châu Nguyên Thông Bảo (周元通寶).

== Types ==
=== Buddhist charms ===
Like with Chinese numismatic Buddhist charms, there are Vietnamese numismatic Buddhist charms that contain Sanskrit inscriptions; however, some of these Buddhist amulets from Vietnam contain only Sanskrit syllables associated with certain sounds but without meaning. These meaningless inscriptions were presumably borrowed from Chinese monks who used them as religious iconography.

==== Pseudo-Sanskrit inscriptions ====
There are Vietnamese amulets that contain the Buddhist prayer "Om mani padme hum" (ॐ मणिपद्मे हूँ), or Án ma ni bát mê hồng (唵嘛呢叭咪吽), written in Devanagari script. This is chanting phrase used by Tibetan monks and has been adapted by other Buddhists in East Asia. In Buddhist schools of meditation the single syllable "Om" (ॐ) in this prayer is used as a focal point to help quiet the mind. These six syllables are said to purify the six realms. Many of these amulets have their inscriptions written in Devanagari is because many of the oldest Buddhist texts were written in Sanskrit later and Pali and many Chinese Buddhist monks studied Sanskrit to better understand these texts. Furthermore, Buddhist monks in Vietnam study Chinese languages to help understand these same texts. Thus there is a fusion of knowledge of both the Sanskrit and the Chinese language which influenced these amulets to both contain a form of pseudo-Devanagari and Chinese script.

=== Open-work charms ===
During the 19th century, a two-sided open-work amulet with a two opposing dragons design within a circular frame. These open-work charms contain a number of Buddhist symbols and religious iconography such as the circular frame symbolising Wheel of Dharma (or Wheel of the Law), which encompasses all of the tenets of Buddhism. Another Buddhist symbol is an umbrella or canopy located on the top, as the umbrella in Buddhist symbolism is a sign of protection as it "shades all medicinal herbs", while the shade of the canopy is said to "protects all living beings".

The design of two dragons are a part of Chinese folk religion, but like in contemporary Chinese and Vietnamese life, indigenous mythology mixed with Buddhism as can be demonstrated in several Buddhist charms which incorporate designs from other religions.

=== Vạn Thọ Thông Bảo ===
During the 60th birthday of Revival Lê dynasty Emperor Lê Hiển Tông in 1774 a special Vạn Thọ Thông Bảo (萬夀通寶) amulet was cast, these charms were often used to commemorate the birthday of an emperor as had happened in the Qing dynasty with the 60th birthdays of Chinese emperors. The reason these charms are cast on this particular event is because 60 years symbolises a complete cycle of the 10 heavenly stems and the 12 earthly branches.

=== The Book of Changes and Bagua charms (Eight Trigram charms) ===
Vietnamese Book of Changes and Bagua charms usually contain inscriptions displaying the Eight Trigrams (八卦, Bát Quái), these are the following Chinese characters: 乾, (☰, Càn) 坎, (☵, Khảm), 艮 (☶, Cấn), 震 (☳, Chấn), 巽 (☴, Tốn), 離 (☲, Ly), 坤 (☷, Khôn), and 兑 (☱, Đoài).

In the case of these coins, "charm" in this context is a catchall term for coin-shaped items which were not official (or counterfeit) money. However, these numismatic objects were not all necessarily considered "magical" or "lucky", as some of these Chinese numismatic charms can be used as "mnemonic coins".

These amulets may further have inscriptions like Trường Sinh Bảo Mạng (長生保命) which translates to "immortality" and "protect life". Such inscriptions would indicate that they were used as "protective" charms.

=== Zodiac charms ===
The Chinese zodiacs appear on several Daoist amulets which were used for divination and fortune telling. Next to the image of each animal, the Chinese character for the animal is displayed.

=== Confucian charms ===
Under the Nguyễn dynasty era Emperor Minh Mạng large (often 48 millimeters in diameter) presentation coins with the inscription Minh Mạng Thông Bảo (明命通寶) were made that featured inscriptions from the Huainanzi on their reverse, it is believed that this work was chosen because it states that a monarch or ruler should embrace both Confucianism and Taoism and attain sagehood. Because the term Minh Mạng (chữ Hán: 明命) can also be translated as "bright life" or "intelligent decree" the inscription Minh Mạng Thông Bảo is commonly used on Vietnamese numismatic charms.

=== Lei Ting curse charms ===
Vietnamese Lei Ting curse charms (or Lôi Đình curse charms) are numismatic charms that contain inscriptions to protect its wearer from evil spirits and ghosts. It was common for people to go to Taoist masters to ask for advice, and in Taoism secretive amulets are often used in ceremonies, while most of these amulets are made from paper. Vietnamese Lei Ting curse charms can have fortune telling symbols and Taoist "magical" incantations.

=== Vietnamese numismatic charms with cash coin inscriptions ===
During the Vietnam War era Vietnamese numismatic charms with cash coin inscriptions were produced in large numbers as souvenirs for foreigners interested in antiques. In large South Vietnamsee cities like Saigon, Da Nang, and Huế, these charms usually sold for $1 or $2. They bore inscriptions of authentic Vietnamese cash coins like Quang Trung Thông Bảo (光中通寶), Gia Long Thông Bảo (嘉隆通寶), and Minh Mạng Thông Bảo (明命通寶), but many also contained fantasy inscriptions like Quang Trung Trọng Bảo (光中重寶), Hàm Nghi Trọng Bảo (咸宜重寶), and Khải Định Trọng Bảo (啓定重寶), the latter of which being based on the Khải Định Thông Bảo (啓定通寶).

Some Vietnam war era replicas may include Hàm Nghi Thông Bảo (咸宜通寶) cash coins, which were produced under Emperor Hàm Nghi in the year 1885, without the reverse inscription "Lục Văn" (六文), or large (1 mạch) Duy Tân Thông Bảo (維新通寶) cash coins with the reverse inscription Trung Quốc Ái Dân (忠國愛民). The latter of these fakes are based on Minh Mạng Thông Bảo Thông Bảo (明命通寶), Thiệu Trị Thông Bảo (紹治通寶), and Tự Đức Thông Bảo (嗣德通寶) cash coins of 1 mạch which had this and similar reverse inscriptions, while in reality no similar large cash coins were ever produced before or after these three series.

=== Marriage charms ===
Vietnamese marriage amulets often display dragon (龍) and phoenix (鳳) motifs, this is because the Vietnamese dragon is often used as a symbol for males, while the Phượng Hoàng (or "phoenix") is used to represent females. When the phoenix is shown together with the dragon this is often meant as a metaphor for the Emperor and Empress.

Some marriage amulets have the obverse inscription Trường Mạng Phú Quý (長命富貴) written in seal script, which translates into English to "Long life, riches, and honour". This inscription symbolises good fortune in marriage as well as protection. There are also some Vietnamese marriage amulets with the inscription Thọ Sơn Phúc Hải (壽山福海, "longevity, mountain, happiness, and sea"), which is a part of a Chinese congratulatory phrase "May your age be as Mount Tai and your happiness as the Eastern Sea" (壽比南山福如東海).

Some Vietnamese marriage amulets contain the Daoist Âm and Dương symbol (or Thái cực đồ), this is because in Daoist Âm symbolises the feminine and Dương symbolises the masculine. Further symbols may include the lotus flower, known as "荷" (Hà) or "蓮" (Sen). In Mandarin Chinese the word for "lotus" has a homonymous sound with the word which means "to bind" as in a marriage contract, "to love", and "to be modest".

A design of Chinese, Korean, and Vietnamese marriage amulets display a pair of fish on one side and the inscription Ngư Song (魚双, "Pair of Fish") on the other side. In various Oriental cultures fish are associated with plenty and abundance. Fish are furthermore noted for their prolific ability to reproduce and that when they swim that this was in joy and are therefore associated with a happy and harmonious marriage. In Feng Shui, a pair of fish are associated with conjugal bliss and the joys of being in a matrimonial union.

"Song of Unending Sorrow" charms, or "Song of Unending Regret" charms, are a common type of marriage coin charm, that might be Chinese, Japanese, Korean Taiwanese, or Vietnamese in origin, that depict part of the 9th century poem Chang hen ge written by Bai Juyi. "Song of Unending Sorrow" charms display four heterosexual couples having sex in various positions (or they are supposed to represent one couple having in four different positions) in the area surrounding the square centre hole of the coin. Surrounding the couples having sex are the Chinese characters representing the spring (春), wind (風), peaches (桃), and plums (李), which is a reference to the first four characters of a line from the Chang hen ge poem which translates into English as "Gone were the breezy spring days when the peach and plum trees were in bloom" in reference to the death of Yang Guifei.

=== Five poisons talismans ===
The five poisons (五毒, Ngũ Độc), or the five noxious creatures, are an ancient Chinese concept that includes a snake, a centipede, a scorpion, a lizard, and a toad. Sometimes the five poisons may also include a spider. These numismatic amulets are a reflection of the taboo of the number 5. Traditionally the fifth day of the fifth month (which in the Chinese calendar falls in June), or "Double Five Day", is considered in traditional Chinese culture to be the day that causes the most illnesses because it's the hottest day. Because of this superstition the number five was also associated with illness. During "Double Five Day" these amulets displaying the five poisons were worn to ward off illnesses and evil. Because the Dragon Boat Festival occurs during this period, it is not uncommon for one of the five poisons to be replaced with a tiger representing the Warring States period person Khuất Nguyên.

Some Five Poisons amulets contain the imperative command inscription Khu Tà Tîch Ác (驅邪辟惡) which could be translated as "Expel Demons and Wicked Sovereigns".

=== Vietnamese gong (khánh) shaped amulets ===
Vietnam has been producing large brass gongs (khánh) shaped as bats for centuries, some Vietnamese amulets are modeled after this shape. While these amulets may also be found in China, they are produced in Vietnam and are one of the few unique categories of Vietnamese numismatic charms. These amulets are associated with wealth and good luck because of their bat shape, which is a homophonic puns in Mandarin Chinese, as the Mandarin Chinese word for "bat" (蝠, fú) sounds like "happiness" (福, fú).

The design of the bat shaped khánh also appears on a 1943 series 20 piastre banknote issued by the Banque de l'Indochine.

=== Plastic numismatic charms ===
During the 20th and 21st centuries Vietnamese numismatic charms with Latin script made from plastics began being produced. The obverse inscription that appears on some of these amulets is "Thần Chúng Cho Ban" which translates to "May the Spirits Bestow Favours". While the reverse of these plastic amulets reads "Sa Cốc Miếu Ân" which translates to "The Temple Sounds Thanks", which could be a reference to when a monk receives a donation at a temple, they will often ring a bell in recognition of this fact.

== List of Vietnamese numismatic charms by inscription ==
List of Vietnamese numismatic charms by inscription (excluding Lei Ting curse charm inscriptions)
Inscription (Chữ Quốc Ngữ)	Inscription (chữ Hán)	Literal English translation	Implied meaning or symbolism	Distribution (Note: Country of production, as many Chinese numismatic charms have the same inscriptions and designs as Vietnamese numismatic charms, as the latter are often based on the former. And to differentiate between exclusive Vietnamese amulets from Chinese coin amulets.)	Catalogue number(s)	Image
Good luck and protective inscriptions
Trường Mạng Phú Quý	長命富貴	"Longevity, riches, and honour"	A good luck inscription.	China and Vietnam	Schroeder #597, Gao & Yu #1-162, Grundmann #271-273, Mandel (MCAC) #15.8.37, Novak #136, Pi page #153 and Yu page #94, Zheng (ed.) #982	
Trường Mạng Phú Quý; Phú Hữu	長命富貴 富有	"Longevity, riches, and honour" "To be wealthy."	A good luck inscription.	Vietnam	Greenbaum #13	
Thọ Sơn Phúc Hải	壽山福海	"Longevity, mountain, happiness, and sea"	A part of a Chinese congratulatory phrase "May your age be as Mount Tai and your happiness as the Eastern Sea" (壽比南山福如東海).	China and Vietnam		
Trường Sinh Bảo Mạng	長生保命	"Immortality" and "Protect life"	A protective inscription.	China and Vietnam	Schroeder #596	
Nguyên Hanh Lợi Trinh; Thọ Trường Phú Quý	元亨利貞 壽長富貴	"Commencing, developing, strengthening, and perfecting" "Longevity, riches, and honour"	The principle (元) to success (亨), and to prosper (利) by divination (貞), being the first four words of the Book of Changes (I-Ching).	China and Vietnam	Schroeder#590, Thierry (ACVN) #69	
Nguyên Hanh Lợi Trinh; Tứ Thìn Đồng Lạc	元亨利貞 四辰同樂	"Initial cause, freedom, good, perfection." "In the four seasons, union in joy!"	"Nguyên Hanh Lợi Trinh" is the first sentence of the Yijing, it explains the Càn hexagram, one of the most auspicious since it is composed of 6 dương lines.	China and Vietnam	Thierry#70	
Nhân Nghĩa Lễ Trí; Tín	仁義禮智 信	"Benevolence, Righteousness, Propriety, Knowledge" "Sincerity"	A good luck inscription.	Vietnam	Schroeder#591	
Càn Khảm Cấn Chấn Tốn Ly Khôn Đoài	乾 坎 艮 震 巽 離 坤 兑	"Heaven, Water, Mountain, Thunder, Wind, Fire, Earth, Lake"	The Eight Trigrams, a Daoist set of symbols.	China and Vietnam	Schroeder#594-596, Thierry (ACVN)#87-92, Zheng (ed.)#1775-1779, 1781	
Long Vân Khánh Hội	龍雲慶會	"Dragon and Cloud a Felicitous Meeting Together"	A good luck inscription.	Vietnam	Schroeder #600	
Trường Mạng Phú Quý Kim Ngọc Mãn Đường	長命富貴金玉滿堂	"Long-Life, Wealth and Honours, Gold and Jade, Success"	High rank and achieving honour.	China and Vietnam	Schroeder #603, Grundmann #633 and #634, Yu page 63, Zheng (ed.) #833	
Càn Nguyên Trường Tiền	乾元長錢	"Everlasting Heaven's Money"	To be lucky in the endeavour of pursuing wealth and money.	Vietnam	Schroeder #605, Thierry (ACVN) #72	
Trạng Nguyên Cập Đệ; Phúc Lộc	狀元及第	"First Doctoral Candidate", "Passed the Examination", "Good Luck and Honours" (Note: The Confucian court examination system in Vietnam (chữ Hán: 越南科舉制度, Chữ Quốc Ngữ: Chế-độ khoa-cử Việt-nam) was a system of examinations The era of Imperial exams in monarchist Vietnam lasted from the year 1076 until 1919 during the French colonial period with a total of 185 exams being given. It is estimated that about 70,000 to 80,000 candidates took the regional exams around the provinces of Vietnam each time these exams were administered. The final (and highest) examination was taken at the Imperial Vietnamese Palace and about 15 candidates became Doctoral Laureates, or Trạng Nguyên (狀元). The bulk of the amulets were produced in China and many of these amulets made their way to Vietnam. These types of amulets that contain inscriptions wishing for success at the imperial examinations were extremely popular among the students that were studying for the Confucian exams. It is very likely that there have been many types of different imperial court examinations amulets produced during the period when Confucian court exams were administered in Vietnam.)	Attaining a high rank in the imperial examinations.	China and Vietnam	Schroeder #606, Gao & Yu #1-138 and #1-139, Grundmann #608 and #609, Mandel (MCAC) #15.8.6 & 15.8.7, Petit #48, Remmelts #9, Thierry (ACVN) #200, Yu Page 134, Zheng (ed.) #907 and #908	
Phúc Lộc Lị Trinh	福祿利貞	"Happiness, Honours, Strengthening, and Perfecting"	High rank and high salary.	Vietnam	Schroeder #607	
Vô Sự Tùng Dung	無事從容	"Without Affairs Gives You Leisure at Large"	Inner peace.	Vietnam	Schroeder #608	
Trinh Phù	貞符 (Note: The Chinese characters Trinh (貞) Phù (符) are located on the top and bottom of the amulet and a pair of flowers on the right and left side of the amulet.)	"Divination Amulet"	An amulet used for divination.	Vietnam	Schroeder #610	
Bổn-Mạng (Bản-Mệnh); Trường-Sinh	本命 長生	"Life" "Immortality"	An inscription wishing for longevity.	Vietnam		
Ngũ Bất; The Eight Trigrams	五不 ☰☱☲☳☴☵☶☷	"The Five Precepts" "The Eight Trigrams"	The five precepts of Buddhism. The Eight Trigrams from Daoism	China and Vietnam	Thierry (ACVN) # 57	
Khu Tà Tîch Ác	驅邪辟惡	"Expel Demons and Wicked Sovereigns"	A protective amulet inscription usually worn during the Dragon Boat Festival.	China and Vietnam	Thierry (ACVN) #108, Yu Pages #17 & #32, Pi Page #16, Zheng (ed.) #895	
Thụ-Di Bách Lộc	受第百祿	"To Receive Numerous Benefits From Heaven"	To receive celestial blessings for good luck and good fortune.	China and Vietnam	Thierry (ACVN) #143	
Chiêu Tài Như Ý Thiên Hạ Thái-Bình; Nhãt Đoàn Hòa Khí	招財如意 天下太平 一團和氣	"Receive All The Riches You Wish" "The Country At Peace" "Embodiment of Harmony"	A good luck inscription.	China and Vietnam	Thierry (ACVN) #222	
Thọ	壽	"Longevity"	A good luck inscription.	China and Vietnam	Thierry (CMV) #1929, Pi Page #125, Zheng (ed.) #921	
Quang Thiên Nguyên Bảo	光天元寶	"Brilliant Heavenly Original Treasure"	A good luck and protective inscription.	Vietnam	Greenbaum #4	
Thiên Hạ Thái Bình	天下太平	"Wishing All the World Be at Peace"	World peace.	Vietnam	Greenbaum #5	
Trường Mạng Phú Quý; Thiên Hạ Thái-Bình	長命富貴 天下太平	"Long Life, Riches and Honours" "The Country At Peace"	A good luck and protective inscription.	Vietnam	Greenbaum #9	
Phẩm Chung Lan Đài	品重蘭臺	"Important Rank within the Orchid Tower"	High rank in the imperial examination system.	Vietnam	Greenbaum #15	
Trảm Tà Trị Quỷ; Vận Nhập Vô Kị	斬邪治鬼 运入無忌	"Destroy Evil, Rule Over Spirits" "Go In and Out Without Fear"	A protective inscription meant to ward off evil spirits.	Vietnam	Greenbaum #17	
Vietnamese numismatic charms with Chinese and Vietnamese cash coin inscriptions
Châu Nguyên Thông Bảo	周元通寶	"Beginning of the Châu, circulating treasure"	An inscription used on a cash coins produced from melted down Buddha statues.	China and Vietnam	Thierry (CMV) #1897, 1900, 1901, 1902, & 1903	
Châu Nguyên Thông Bảo; Bình Nam	周元通寶 平南	"Beginning of the Châu, circulating treasure" "Bình Nam"	An inscription used on a cash coins produced from melted down Buddha statues. A mint mark that also appeared on some Cảnh Hưng Thông Bảo (景興通寶) cash coins.	Vietnam	Schroeder #505	
Hồng Ðức Thông Bảo; Thiên Hạ Thái Bình	洪德通寶 天下太平	"Hồng Ðức circulating treasure" "All the World Be at Peace"	A Later Lê dynasty cash coin inscription with an amulet reverse inscription.	Vietnam	Greenbaum #11	
Cảnh Thịnh Thông Bảo	景盛通寶	"Cảnh Thịnh circulating treasure"	A Tây Sơn dynasty cash coin inscription.	Vietnam	Greenbaum #7	
Minh Mạng Thông Bảo; Phú Thọ Ða Nam	明命通寶 富壽多男	"Minh Mạng circulating treasure" "Wealth, Long Life, and Many (Male) Children"	A presentation coin used as an amulet.	Vietnam	Thierry (CMV) #1896, Schroeder #168	
Vietnamese numismatic charms with commemorative inscriptions
Vạn Thọ Thông Bảo	萬夀通寶	"Ten thousand longevities, circulating treasure"	To commemorate the 60th birthday of the reigning Emperor.	China and Vietnam	Greenbaum #10	
Fantasy cash coin inscriptions
Chính Đức Thông Bảo	正德通寶	"Chính Đức circulating treasure"	Fantasy Ming dynasty cash coin.	China and Vietnam	Thierry (ACVN) #174, Grundmann #1216, (Note: See also pages 224 – 227 (Grundmann) with a series of similar pieces.) Greenbaum #22	
Quang Trung Trọng Bảo	光中重寶	"Quang Trung heavy treasure"	A fantasy cash coin, based on the Quang Trung Thông Bảo (光中通寶), to be sold to tourists and American soldiers stationed in South Vietnam during the Vietnam War.	Vietnam		
Hàm Nghi Trọng Bảo	咸宜重寶	"Hàm Nghi heavy treasure"	A fantasy cash coin, based on the Hàm Nghi Thông Bảo (咸宜通寶), to be sold to tourists and American soldiers stationed in South Vietnam during the Vietnam War.	Vietnam		
Khải Định Trọng Bảo	啓定重寶	"Khải Định heavy treasure"	A fantasy cash coin, based on the Khải Định Thông Bảo (啓定通寶), to be sold to tourists and American soldiers stationed in South Vietnam during the Vietnam War.	Vietnam		
Buddhist amulets with pseudo-Sanskrit inscriptions
Inscription (Latin script)	Inscription (Original script)	Literal English translation	Implied meaning or symbolism	Distribution	Catalogue number(s)	Image
Om Ma Ni Pad; Me Hum	ཨོཾ མ ཎི པ དྨེ ཧཱུྃ	"Om mani padme hum" (Note: While the amulet does not completely represent the Tibetan chant of "Om mani padme hum" (ཨོཾ་མ་ཎི་པདྨེ་ཧཱུྃ), it does convey the concept well enough to be considered a representation of the phrase "Om Ma Ni Pad Me Hum".)	A Buddhist prayer.	Vietnam	Schroeder #611, Lacroix #393, Thierry (ACVN) #53, #54 and #55, Thierry (CMV) #553, Zheng (ed.) #1932 and #1985	
Om Ma Ni Pad; Me Hum Khang-Cát	ཨོཾ མ ཎི པ 銘洪康吉	"Om mani padme" "Me hum", "To be healthy and happy"	A Buddhist prayer.	Vietnam	Schroeder #612, Thierry (ACVN) #53, #54 and #55, Thierry (CMV) #553, Zheng (ed.) #1932 and #1985	
Other Buddhist inscriptions
Om Ma Ni Pad Me Hum [A Daoist "secret writing" character] Trường Mạng Phú Quý; The Eight Trigrams	口奄 口牛 口迷 口八 口尼 口麻 吶 咺 (Note: A Daoist "secret writing" character used in a magic spell incantation to expel evil spirits. This Chinese character (chữ Hán) refers to a "dead ghost" and its purpose can be better understood by using the following analogy. When a person dies in Chinese mythology, he or she becomes a ghost. Living people greatly dislike seeing ghosts. Similarly, it is believed in Chinese mythology that ghosts are afraid when they see a "dead ghost" and will run away. The ancient Chinese, therefore, believed that ghosts will be scared away if this Daoist magic character, meaning "dead ghost", is hung somewhere in their homes or worn as an amulet.) 長命富貴 ☰☱☲☳☴☵☶☷	"To shout Majestically "Om Ma Ni Pad Me Hum"; A Daoist "magic" incantation (To Expel Evil)." "Longevity, riches, and honour" The Eight Trigrams	A Buddhist prayer and Daoist magic spell incantation.	China and Vietnam		
Om Ma Ni Pad Me Hum; The Eight Trigrams	奄 口麻 口尼 口八 口爾 口牛 ☰☱☲☳☴☵☶☷	Chinese Characters Representing "Om Ma Ni Pad Me Hum". "The Eight Trigrams".	A Buddhist prayer and Daoist religious symbolism.	China and Vietnam	Thierry (CMV) #553	
Om Ma Ni Pad; Me Hum	口奄 口麻 口尼 鉢 銘 洪	"Om mani padme hum"	A Buddhist prayer.	Vietnam		
Me hum	銘洪	"Me hum"	A Buddhist prayer.	Vietnam		
Chúa Xứ Thánh Mẫu; Châu Đốc (Obverse in Latin script)	母聖處主 朱篤 (Reverse in Traditional Chinese characters)	"Temple of the Region's Revered Lady" "City of Châu Đốc"	A token coin issued by a Buddhist temple.	Vietnam	Greenbaum #14	
Marriage inscriptions
Tứ Thìn Đồng Lạc	四辰同樂	"In All Four Seasons May There Be Happiness"	Bliss and happiness in marriage	Vietnam	Schroeder #592-593, Novak #93, Thierry (ACVN) #71	
Phú Quý Khang Ninh	富貴康寧	"Riches, Honours, Health and Peace"	A good luck and marriage inscription	Vietnam	Schroeder #601-602, Lacroix Rubbings #394, #395 and #396, Thierry (CMV) #1904 and #1905, Thierry (ACVN) #152	
Thái Bình Đồng Lạc	太平同樂	"Peace and Happiness Together"	A marriage inscription.	Vietnam	Schroeder #604	
Phu Phụ Hòa Hài; Tử Tôn Phồn Thịnh	夫婦和諧 子孫繁盛	"Husband and Wife, Harmonious Reverse" "Children and Grand-Children in Abundance"	A marriage inscription.	Vietnam	Schroeder #609	
Ngư Song	魚双	"A pair of fish"	A marriage inscription.	China, Korea, and Vietnam	Thierry (ACVN) #235, Gao & Yu Page #387, Mandel (TLKCA) #74.2a (32mm) and #74.2b (30 mm)	
Liên Sinh Lục Tử	連生六子	"Wishing Continuous Births of Six Sons"	A wish for having male offspring.	China and Vietnam	Greenbaum #3	
Tung Bách Mệnh Gia; Thiên Hạ Thái Bình	嵩百命家 天下太平	"Lofty Life, Hundreds of Offspring" "The Country at Peace"	A marriage inscription.	China and Vietnam	Grundmann #729	
Plastic amulets with Latin inscriptions
Thần Chúng Cho Ban; Sa Cốc Miếu Ân	NA	"May the Spirits Bestow Favours" "The Temple Sounds Thanks"	Religious good luck amulet	Vietnam	Greenbaum #18	

== Notes ==
=== Catalogue numbers ===
- Thierry (ACVN) = Amulettes de Chine et du Viet-Nam by François Thierry de Crussol (1987), in French.
- Thierry (CMV) = François Thierry, Catalogue des Monnaies Vietnamiennes - Supplément, Bibliothèque nationale de France, Paris (2002).
- Greenbaum = Craig Greenbaum, Amulets of Vietnam. Houston (2004).
- Grundmann = Amulette Chinas und seiner Nachbarländer by Horst Grundmann (2003), in German.
- John Sylvester, Jr. and André Hüsken, authors of: The Traditional Awards of Annam, Copyright 2001, ISBN 3-89757-097-1
- Zheng (ed.) = Zheng, Dr. Yiwei (editor) Classic Chinese Charms (花钱图典), Copyright 2004.
- Novak = Novak, John A. A Working Aid for Collecors of Annamese Coins, Merced, CA: Anderson 1989 Revised edition.
- Lacroix = Lacroix, Désiré - Numismatique Annamite, Saigon: Menard & Legros 1900.

== Sources ==
- Greenbaum, Craig (2006). "Amulets of Vietnam".
