= Korean numismatic charm =

Money-inspired amulets for good luck

Korean numismatic charms (Korean: 열쇠패; lit. odd coins), also known as Korean amulets, Korean talismans, or simply Korean charms, are a family of cash coin-like and other numismatic-inspired types of charms that like the Japanese and Vietnamese variants are derived from Chinese numismatic charms (also referred to as Yansheng coins or huāqián), but have evolved around the customs of the Korean culture. Although most of these charms resemble Korean cash coins and the amulet coins of China, they contain their own categories unique to Korea. There are approximately 500 different known variants of Korean numismatic charms.

During the Joseon dynasty, only the Yangban class could afford money. A common Korean family would often only have one or two amulets to "protect" their family and was not able to afford a large quantity of them. The Yangban, however, could afford to buy Korean amulets and charms and they frequently decorated the homes of the wealthy aristocracy. As the Japanese started taking over Korea in the beginning of the twentieth century, many Korean families started selling whatever they could to get by, and when there was a global copper shortage in 1907, millions of Korean numismatic charms and Korean mun cash coins were sold for only their intrinsic value in copper. After Korea became a Japanese colony the Japanese started collecting all the copper they could find for the war effort, which is why Korean numismatic charms became less common.

In some instances, regular Sangpyeong Tongbo (Hanja: 常平通寶) cash coins were turned into amulets by making their outer shapes from round to octagonal as a reference to the eight trigrams, while seven holes representing the seven stars from Korean folk art were drilled into them. The widespread success of the Sangpyeong Tongbo cash coins also brought about many social changes to Korean society. One of these changes was the emergence of byeoljeon, these were non-monetary decorative people that reflected on the desire of people to gain more wealth.

== Uses ==
In the case of these coins, "charm" in this context is a catchall term for coin-shaped items which were not official (or counterfeit) money. However, these numismatic objects were not all necessarily considered "magical" or "lucky", as some of these Chinese numismatic charms can be used as "mnemonic coins".

== Korean bird-worm seal script coin to teach Chinese characters ==
During the Japanese colonisation of Korea from around the 1920s (Note: The earliest record of the existence of this Korean numismatic charm apparently dates to the 1920s in a rubbing from a Korean coin collector known in Mandarin Chinese as Li De Zhuang (丽德庄).) a usual Korean amulet appeared that bore an inscription written in bird-worm seal script (Note: Chinese sources more familiar with ancient styles of Chinese calligraphy state that the calligraphy on this numismatic charm is a "mutilated" form of Chinese seal script with many "modernised" characters or a "faux" seal script, as opposed to actual bird-worm seal script.) that reads "水得女汝, 月於日明" if read clockwise, (Note: The inscription of this amulet is read clockwise starting at about the 8 o'clock position.) however multiple hypotheses have been proposed as to what the actual reading order is, the amulet attempts to teach its readers how to read Chinese characters by using simple formulas like "氵+ 女 = 汝" (Note: The formula being "water" (氵) plus "woman" (女) is "you" (汝)) and "月 + 日 = 明". (Note: The formula being "sun" (日) plus "moon" (月) is "bright" (明).) Some Chinese and Japanese sources claim that this charm may have a hidden meaning and that the last four characters actually read "勿於日易" (McCune–Reischauer: Mul O Il I; Revised Romanisation: Mul Eo Il I) which would make it "勿 + 日 = 易" (Note: The formula being "do not" (勿) plus "sun" (日) is "easy" (易).) which could have a hidden meaning like "do not do business with Japan" which explains why it is written in such a rare and unusual script as opposed to the more common regular script which was the preferred script of Korea for centuries. Its reverse inscription reads "寸得冠守絲負工紅" (Note: The inscription is read clockwise beginning at the 7 o'clock position.) (촌득관수사부공홍; Chondeukgwansusabugonghong; Ch'ontukkwansusapukonghong) where it teaches two other Chinese characters, namely "寸 + 宀 = 守" (Note: The formula being "inch" (寸) plus a "roof" (宀) on the top is "protect" (守).) and "丝 + 工 = 紅". (Note: The formula being "silk" (丝) plus "labour" (工) is "red" (紅).)

The charm is made from a copper-alloy and has a diameter of 36.50 millimeters, and a weight of about 13.07 grams.

== Korean numismatic chatelaines ==
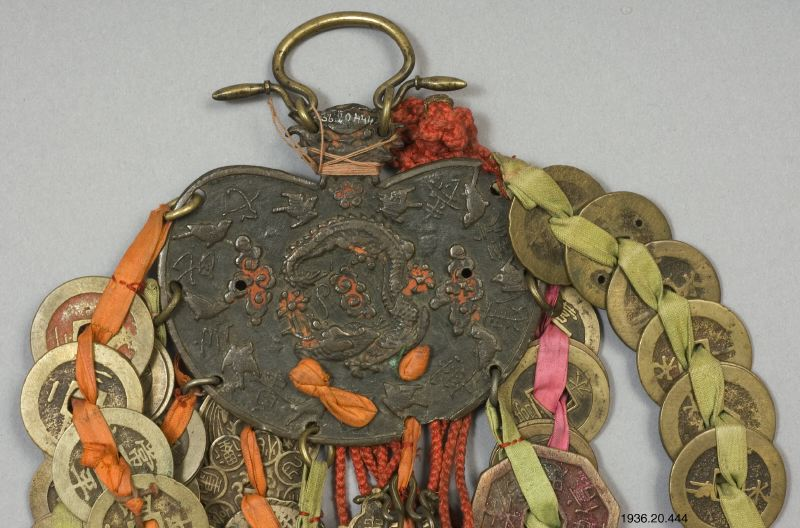
A Korean numismatic chatelaine on display at the Museum of Ethnography, Sweden

Korean numismatic chatelaines are a type of Korean numismatic charm that are characterized by the fact that they resemble a chatelaine often with other Korean coin charms and amulets strung to it, and are usually fully embellished with tassels, ribbons and Korean Sangpyeong Tongbo mun coins. A frequent design of these chatelaines is to have the Hanja character "壽" (longevity), other common decorations on Korean numismatic chatelaines include images of children, five bats symbolizing the five blessings, haetae, and birds. By the nineteenth century it had become customary for the wealthy families of Korea to tie amulets to much larger pieces similar to what in the western world is called a chatelaine. These Korean "chatelaines" were presented to brides on the day of her wedding. After the wedding was over, they were kept hanging in the women's quarters of the residence. In some cases hundreds of charms were tied together in these "chatelaines", which is why they are often cast as open-work charms. Others have many rings, and others will have a lot of holes for stringing drilled or cast in them. It was also not uncommon for Korean families to tie these numismatic charms together without the "chatelaine". As the ribbons of these Korean numismatic chatelaines are brittle and break easily, it is not uncommon for modern coin and exonumia dealers to remove all amulets and talismans and sell them separately, which is why these objects have become even rarer in the modern era.

== Marriage charms ==
A design of Chinese, Korean, and Vietnamese marriage amulets display a pair of fish on one side and the inscription Eo ssang (魚双, "Pair of Fish") on the other side. In various Oriental cultures fish are associated with plenty and abundance. Fish are furthermore noted for their prolific ability to reproduce and that when they swim that this was in joy and are therefore associated with a happy and harmonious marriage. In Feng Shui, a pair of fish are associated with conjugal bliss and the joys of being in a matrimonial union.

A common design for Korean marriage charms displays scenes of a heterosexual couple engaging in different positions of sexual intercourse.

"Song of Unending Sorrow" charms, or "Song of Unending Regret" charms, are a common type of marriage coin charm, that might be Chinese, Japanese, Korean Taiwanese, or Vietnamese in origin, that depict part of the 9th century poem Chang hen ge written by Bai Juyi. "Song of Unending Sorrow" charms display four heterosexual couples having sex in various positions (or they are supposed to represent one couple having in four different positions) in the area surrounding the square center hole of the coin. Surrounding the couples having sex are the Chinese characters representing the spring (春), wind (風), peaches (桃), and plums (李), which is a reference to the first four characters of a line from the Chang hen ge poem which translates into English as "Gone were the breezy spring days when the peach and plum trees were in bloom" in reference to the death of Yang Guifei.

== Other categories of Korean numismatic charms ==
- Open-work charm

== See also ==
- Bujeok

== Sources ==
- Greenbaum, Craig (2006). Amulets of Viet Nam (Bùa Việt-Nam - 越南符銭).
- Korean dictionary of Talisman (霊符作大典, Yeongbujak Daeten).
- op den Velde, Wybrand; Hartill, David (12 November 2013). Cast Korean Coins and Charms. New Generation Publishing. ISBN 978-0755215942.
