= Zhengde Tongbao =

Fantasy cash coin, Chinese, and Vietnamese numismatic charm

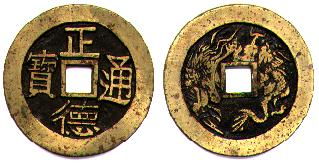
A Zhengde Tongbao marriage charm.

The Zhengde Tongbao (traditional Chinese: 正德通寶; simplified Chinese: 正德通宝; pinyin: Zhèngdé tōng bǎo; lit. 'Circulating coinage of True Virtue'; Vietnamese: Chính Đức Thông Bảo / Chánh Đức Thông Bảo) is a fantasy cash coin, Chinese, and Vietnamese numismatic charm bearing an inscription based on the reign title of the Zhengde Emperor of the Ming dynasty. The Zhengde Emperor reigned from the year 1505 until 1521, however during this period no circulating cash coins were minted. There were a large amount "cash coins" bearing the Zhengde era name are minted from the late Ming to early Qing dynasty periods as superstitious "lucky coins" with auspicious depictions and instructions (making them Chinese numismatic charms), as this inscription remained popular for charms modern reproductions of the Zhengde Tongbao are also very common.

A popular saying in imperial China was "If a household has a Zhengde coin, there will be material wealth and honour for ten thousand years" (家有正德錢富貴萬萬年, jiā yǒu zhèng dé qián fù guì wàn wàn nián).

== Overview ==
It is generally believed that there were no cash coins minted by the government of the Ming dynasty under the reign of the Zhengde Emperor, however it has been claimed that a small number of cash coins were cast; there does not seem to be any evidence supporting this claim. A common belief was that there were two and a half genuine cash coins in China which is what made these amulets lucky objects. Despite the fact that no Zhengde Tongbao were ever officially cast by the Ming dynasty a very large amount of them do exist today in the form of Chinese numismatic charms and amulets which is likely due to the fact that the inscription Zhengde Tongbao (正德通寶) could be translated as "currency of correct virtue" or "Coinage of True Virtue". Another possible reason why such a large number of Chinese numismatic charms with the inscription "Zhengde Tongbao" were cast is because it was believed by many people during the Ming dynasty that the Zhengde Emperor was the reincarnation of a "swimming" dragon which gave the rise to the belief that carrying a Zhengde Tongbao amulet will protect its wearer from big waves while crossing a body of water such as the sea or a river. Other superstitions surrounding Zhengde Tongbao coins included that they protected pregnant women and their unborn offspring and that these coins would also help its carriers win gambling games. During Chinese new year Zhengde Tongbao cash coins were also given as "new year's lucky money" (壓歲錢, yā suì qián).

Zhengde Tongbao charms commonly feature the image of a dragon and a fenghuang on their reverses, when a Chinese dragon and fenghuang are shown together they often symbolise the union of a man and a woman meaning that these Zhengde Tongbao charms were used as Chinese marriage charms. Although Gary Ashkenazy claims that the dragon and fenghuang symbolises matrimony, it is argued by Edgar J. Mandel in his book Metal Charms and Amulets of China that the dragon and fenghuang actually represent the power of the imperial Chinese government where the dragon represents the Emperor and the fenghuang the Empress. Another variant of the Zhengde Tongbao has two dragons on its reverse chasing after the wish-granting pearl.

Another variant of the Zhengde Tongbao charm only contains the Hanzi character wén (文) on its reverse which is usually used as a measure word for counting cash coins but could also mean "obverse". These coins were also exclusively used as charms and amulets and were not meant for circulation.

Edgar J.Mandel's book Metal Charms and Amulets of China lists 41 variants of the Zhengde Tongbao charm.

== See also ==
- Ming dynasty coinage

== Sources ==
- Edgar J.Mandel. Metal Charms and Amulets of China.
