= Shenshu and Yulü =

Deities in Chinese mythology

New Year pictures from the late Qing dynasty depicting Shenshu and Yulü

Shenshu or Shentu (Chinese: 神荼) and Yulü or Yulei (simplified Chinese: 郁垒; traditional Chinese: 鬱壘) are a pair of deities in Chinese mythology who punished evil spirits by binding them in reed ropes and feeding them to tigers. Their images together with reed rope seasonally adorned the doors or gates to ward off evil, and are considered the earliest examples of Menshen (門神, 'gate deities' or 'door gods') venerated under such practice. Later traditions identified other gods or deified people as gate deities.

The description dates to writings from the 1st and 2nd centuries AD, during the Eastern Han dynasty, and the attribution to the Classic of Mountains and Seas dating much earlier appears to be spurious.

== Early sources ==
The earliest record of Shenshu and Yulü occurs in a passage quoted from Shanhaijing (山海經; Classic of Mountains and Seas) in Wang Chong (d., c. 97 AD)'s Lunheng (論衡, "Discourses in the Balance", although the passage is not found in surviving recensions of the Shanhajing, and the attribution to the earlier work is disputed. (Note: "[The passage is] not given in the current [extant] Shanhajing, and according to Minoru Matsuda who analyzed the expressions and contents in details, it considering it as to be a lost text [from it] would be difficult. 現行『山海経』には記載がなく、表現や内容を詳細に検討した松田稔氏によると、その逸文とも考えにくい".)

The passage records the myth that two gods Shenshu and Yulü (Note: Wade–Giles:Shen-t'u and Yü-lü.) stand upon a giant peach tree that "twists and coils as far as 3000 li". (Note: "twists and coils" (verb qupan, 屈蟠). Hence the peach is identifiable with the famed "coiling peach tree" (pantao; 蟠桃), i.e. the tree of the peaches of immortality.) At the tree's north-east was the ghost gate (guimen; 鬼門; also 'gate of the spirits of the dead [demons]'). At the ghost gate, the two gods inspected the transit of countless dead spirits, and the evil-deeded ones they bound with reed rope and fed to tigers. This gave rise to the custom, allegedly set forth by the Yellow Emperor (Huangdi), that at the change of seasons, giant peachwood dolls shall be erected, the two gate gods and the tiger be painted on doors, and a reed rope be left to hang, in order to ward against evil. (Note: Lunheng, "Dinggui [Defining ghosts] 訂鬼篇".)

The account is repeated with slightly differing wording elsewhere (Note: Lunheng, "Luanlong [Discussing on dragons] 亂龍篇".) and instead of invoking the legendary Huangdi, it is stated that the "district office" (i.e., the Han dynasty administration) practices the use of peachwood figures and gate paintings for apotropaic use.

Cai Yong (蔡邕 d. 192)'s Duduan, (獨斷; 'Soitary decisions[?]' on ceremonial matters) is another source (Note: Hojo, citing Cai Yong's Duduan (獨斷/独断 上巻 疫神)) which contains a mostly identical passage, and another corroborative source of this period, Ying Shao's Fengsu Tongyi (c. 195) also provides a similar description. (Note: The Fengsu Tongyi claims to quote from the Huangdi shu "Book of the Yellow Emperor", aka Huangdi Sijing.) (Note: "Shen Tu" "Yu Lei" are the readings of the names of gods by Ptak.) These sources add that the decorations are put up on New Year's Eve, or to quote more literally "the night before the La rites" (La 臘; held at the end of the year; precursor of Laba Festival). The peach figures, also called taogeng (桃梗) are wood carvings. (Note: Zhan Guo Ce (戰國策; 'Strategies of the Warring States'), quoted in the Fengsu Tongyi entry. The quote represents a fictitious dialogue between a clay figure (Chinese: 土偶) and a peachwood figure (taogeng), used as parable by Su Qin discourage Lord Mengchang from invading Qin. The taogeng is peach wood carved into human form (Japanese: "桃の木を刻削して人の形"), as this source states.)

This legend has been commented on as the traceable origin myth for the cult of the posting of the Menshen gate deities, and in later times, different deities have superseded them as gate gods to a large measure, but regionally, Shenshu and Yulü still continue to be employed as the New Year's guardian gate gods.

== Later history ==
The carven peachwood figures (taogeng, etc.) were later simplified using peachwood boards, known as peach[wood] charms (taofu; Chinese: 桃符), and portraits of Shenshu and Yulü were drawn on the boards, or their names written on them.

Later in the 8th century, it has been held the Taizong of the Tang dynasty (second emperor and co-founder of dynasty) appointed his generals Qin Qiong and Yuchi Gong to serve as personal bodyguards to protect him from evil spirits, which later led to the popular custom of using the generals as the gate deities. However, by the 9th century, they were replaced by Zhong Kui (鐘馗), the famed ghost catcher (demon-queller).

couplets (lian; Chinese: 聯) began to be written on the taofu boards around the 10th century.

The taofu, according to a 13th-century description, was a thin planks 4–5 cun (≈inches) wide and 2–3 chi (≈feet) long, inscribed with the name of Yulü on the left and Shenshu on the right, garnished with pictures of deities and mythical beasts, the lion-like suanni (狻猊) and the ox-like baize (白澤). Spring (New Year) greetings and propitiatory words were also added to it. The boards were replaced every new year. (Note: Chen Yuanjing (13c.), Suishiguangji (歲時廣記, "Extensive records of the [Four] Seasons"), Book Five, article on "xietaopan 寫桃版". Cited by Shimada (2003), p. 105)

The peach boards were eventually replaced by paper, and became the precursor of the modern day chunlian (春聯; 春联, "spring couplets").

The Qing dynasty period scholar Yu Zhengxie (Guisi cungao 癸巳存稿, Book 13) conjectured that originally there were not two door gods, but perhaps one, though this was evidently based on a misinterpretation of the quote from a classic work. (Note: Sima Biao's Continuation of the Book of Han or Xu han shu, "History of Etiquettes" 礼仪志.) But the question of 1 god or 2 as a moot argument for Yu, whose main thesis was that the gate gods Shenshu and Yulü originated from the concept of the "peachwood mallet/hammer" (taozhui or taochui; 挑椎).
