= Couplet =

Pair of successive lines of metre in poetry

In poetry, a couplet (/ˈkʌplət/ CUP-lət) or distich (/ˈdɪstɪk/ DISS-tick) is a pair of successive lines that rhyme and have the same metre. A couplet may be formal (closed) or run-on (open). In a formal (closed) couplet, each of the two lines is end-stopped, implying that there is a grammatical pause at the end of a line of verse. In a run-on (open) couplet, the meaning of the first line continues to the second.

== Background ==
The word "couplet" comes from the French word meaning "two pieces of iron riveted or hinged together". The term "couplet" was first used to describe successive lines of verse in Sir P. Sidney's Arcadia in 1590: "In singing some short coplets, whereto the one halfe beginning, the other halfe should answere."

While couplets traditionally rhyme, not all do. Poems may use white space to mark out couplets if they do not rhyme. Couplets in iambic pentameter are called heroic couplets. John Dryden in the 17th century and Alexander Pope in the 18th century were both well known for their writing in heroic couplets. The Poetic epigram is also in the couplet form. Couplets can also appear as part of more complex rhyme schemes, such as sonnets.

Rhyming couplets are one of the simplest rhyme schemes in poetry. Because the rhyme comes so quickly, it tends to call attention to itself. Good rhyming couplets tend to "explode" as both the rhyme and the idea come to a quick close in two lines. Here are some examples of rhyming couplets where the sense as well as the sound "rhymes":

True wit is nature to advantage dress'd;
What oft was thought, but ne'er so well express'd.
— Alexander Pope

Whether or not we find what we are seeking
Is idle, biologically speaking.
— Edna St. Vincent Millay (at the end of a sonnet)

On the other hand, because rhyming couplets have such a predictable rhyme scheme, they can feel artificial and plodding. Here is a Pope parody of the predictable rhymes of his era:

Where-e'er you find "the cooling western breeze,"
In the next line, it "whispers through the trees;"
If crystal streams "with pleasing murmurs creep,"
The reader's threatened (not in vain) with "sleep."

== In English poetry ==
Regular rhyme was not originally a feature of English poetry: Old English verse came in metrically paired units somewhat analogous to couplets, but constructed according to alliterative verse principles. The rhyming couplet entered English verse in the early Middle English period through the imitation of medieval Latin and Old French models. The earliest surviving examples are a metrical paraphrase of the Lord's Prayer in short-line couplets, and the Poema Morale in septenary (or "heptameter") couplets, both dating from the twelfth century.

Rhyming couplets were often used in Middle English and early modern English poetry. Chaucer's Canterbury Tales, for instance, is predominantly written in rhyming couplets, and Chaucer also incorporated a concluding couplet into his rhyme royal stanza. Similarly, Shakespearean sonnets often employ rhyming couplets at the end to emphasize the theme. Take one of Shakespeare's most famous sonnets, Sonnet 18, for example (the rhyming couplet is shown in italics):

Shall I compare thee to a summer's day?
Thou art more lovely and more temperate:
Rough winds do shake the darling buds of May,
And summer's lease hath all too short a date:
Sometimes too hot the eye of heaven shines,
And often is his gold complexion dimm'd;
And every fair from fair sometime declines,
By chance or nature's changing course untrimm'd;
But thy eternal summer shall not fade
Nor lose possession of that fair thou owest;
Nor shall Death brag thou wander'st in his shade,
When in eternal lines to time thou growest:
So long as men can breathe or eyes can see,
So long lives this and this gives life to thee.

In the late seventeenth century and early eighteenth-century English rhyming couplets achieved the zenith of their prestige in English verse, in the popularity of heroic couplets. The heroic couplet was used by famous poets for ambitious translations of revered Classical texts, for instance, in John Dryden's translation of the Aeneid and in Alexander Pope's translation of the Iliad.

Though poets still sometimes write in couplets, the form fell somewhat from favour in English in the twentieth century; contemporary poets writing in English sometimes prefer unrhymed couplets, distinguished by layout rather than by matching sounds.

== In Chinese poetry ==
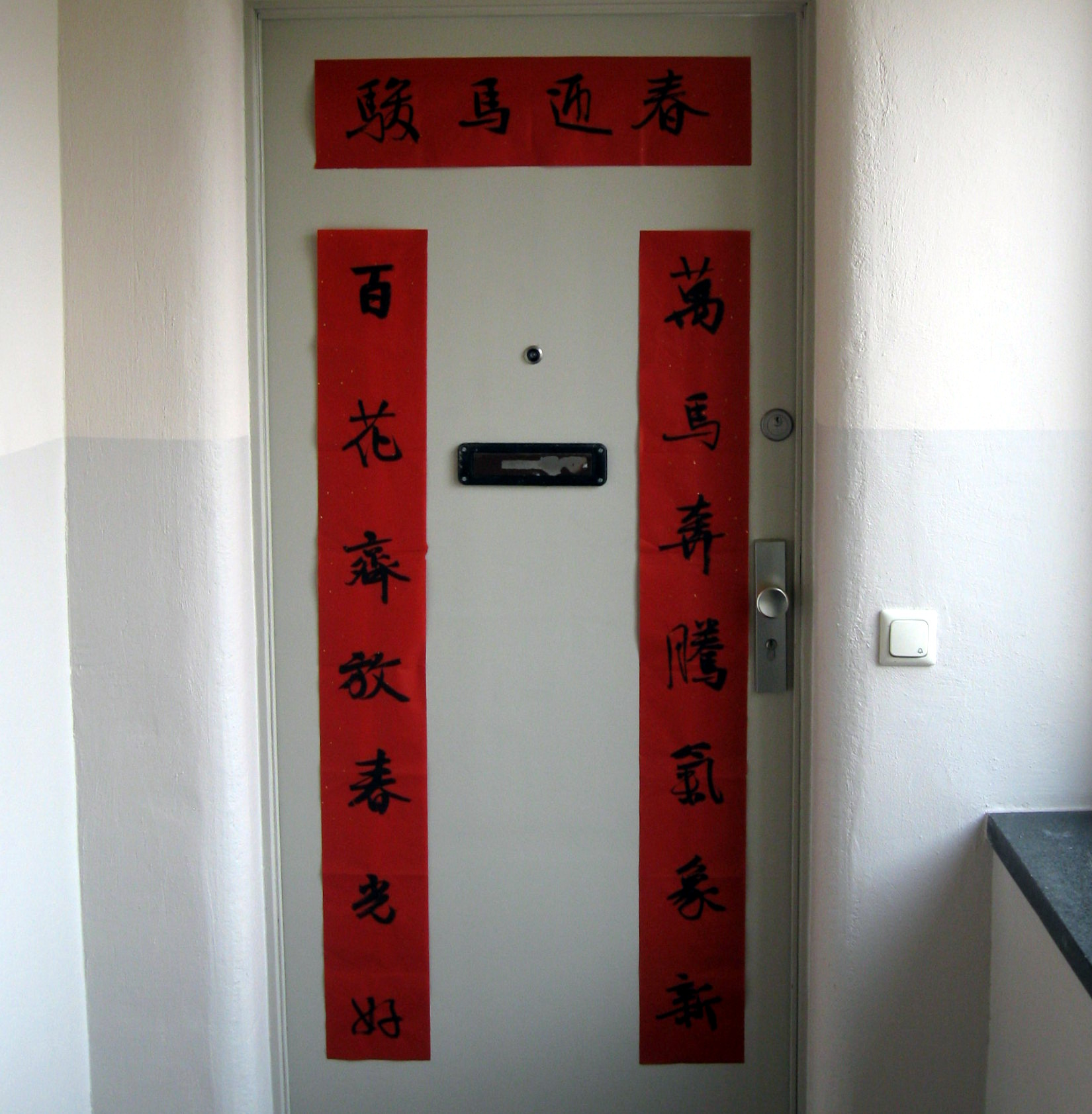
A chunlian on doorway

Couplets called duilian may be seen on doorways in Chinese communities worldwide. Duilian displayed as part of the Chinese New Year festival, on the first morning of the New Year, are called chunlian (春聯; 春联). These are usually purchased at a market a few days before and glued to the doorframe. The text of the couplets is often traditional and contains hopes for prosperity. Other chunlian reflect more recent concerns. For example, the CCTV New Year's Gala usually promotes couplets reflecting current political themes in mainland China.

Some duilian may consist of two lines of four characters each. Duilian are read from top to bottom where the first line starts from the right.

== In Tamil poetry ==
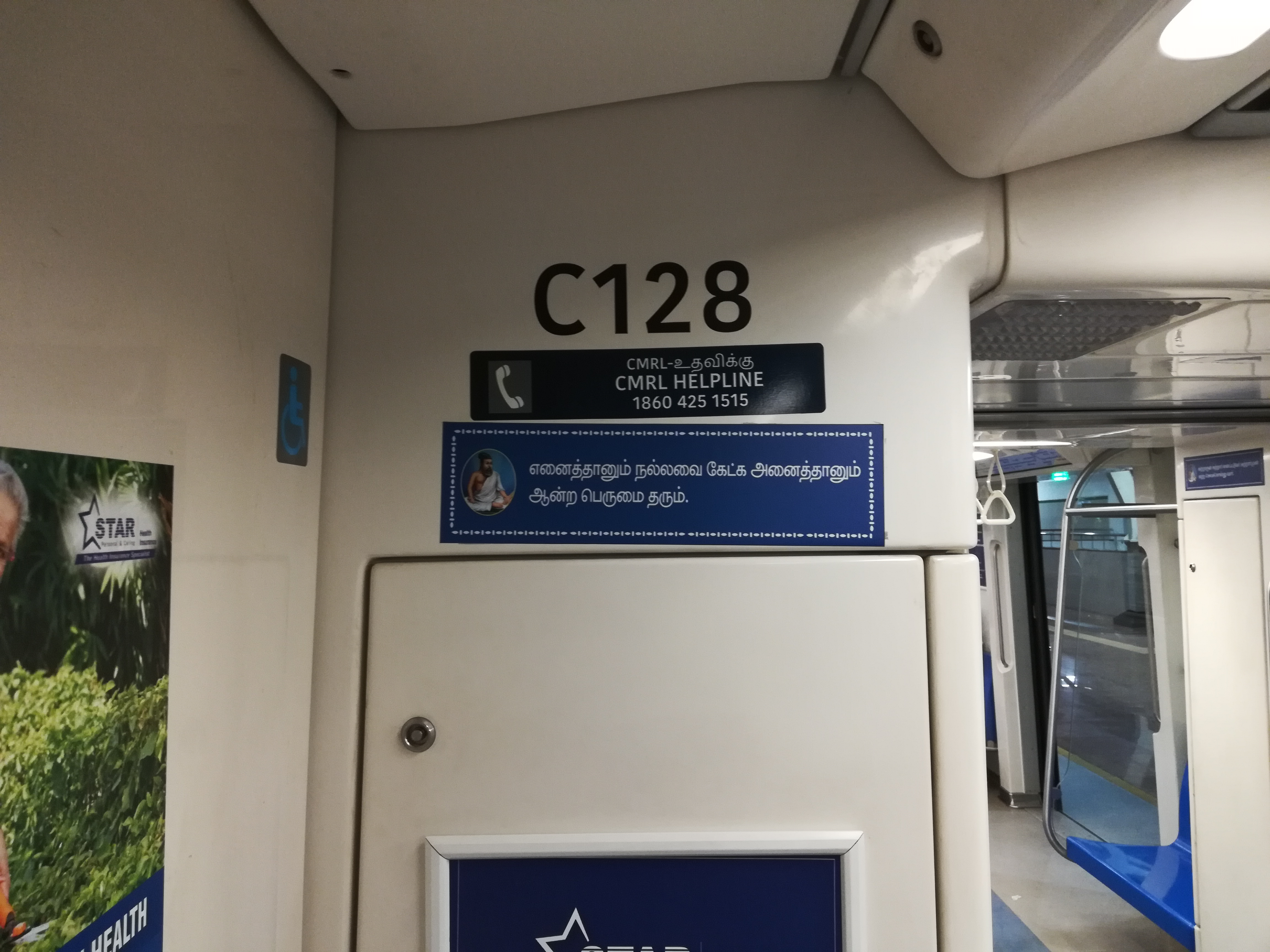
A Kural couplet on display inside a Chennai Metro train

Tamil literature contains some of the notable examples of ancient couplet poetry. The Tamil language has a rich and refined grammar for couplet poetry, and distichs in Tamil poetry follow the venpa metre. One of the most notable examples of Tamil couplet poetry is the ancient Tamil moral text of the Tirukkural, which contains a total of 1330 couplets written in the kural venpa metre from which the title of the work was derived centuries later. Each Kural couplet is made of exactly 7 words—4 in the first line and 3 in the second. The first word may rhyme with the fourth or the fifth word. Below is an example of a couplet:

இலன்என்று தீயவை செய்யற்க செய்யின்
இலனாகும் மற்றும் பெயர்த்து. (Tirukkural, verse 205)

Transliteration: Ilan endru theeyavai seyyarkka seyyin
Ilanaagum matrum peyartthu

Translation: Make not thy poverty a plea for ill;
Thine evil deeds will make thee poorer still. (Pope, 1886)

== In Hindustani poetry ==
In Hindi, a couplet is called a doha, while in Urdu, it is called a sher.

Couplets were the most common form of poetry between the 12th and 18th centuries in Hindustan. Famous poets include Kabir, Tulsidas and Rahim Khan-i-Khanan.

Kabir (also known as Kabirdas) is thought to be one of the greatest composers of Hindustani couplets.

== Distich ==
The American poet J. V. Cunningham was noted for many distichs included in the various forms of epigrams included in his poetry collections, as exampled here:

Deep summer, and time passes. Sorrow wastes
To a new sorrow. While Time heals time hastes

== See also ==
- Biblical poetry
- Chastushka
- Closed couplet
- Coupletist
- Elegiac couplet
- Kabirdas
- Monostich
- Parallelism
- Tristich
