= Four Happiness Boys =

The image of the Four Happiness Boys is believed to have begun during the Ming Dynasty (1368–1644) by a child prodigy by the name of Jie Jin.

By the age of five, this remarkable child had studied and mastered the ancient Chinese ‘Four Books’ and the ‘Five Classics' and soon made his way into formal studies alongside other renowned Chinese scholars of the period. The "Four Happiness Boys" is the ancient Chinese image or drawing of two interconnected boys to create the illusion of four laughing boys lying in four directions. The picture symbolizes ‘four happiness joined together’, which basically were: (a) a wedding night, (b)passing the imperial exams, (c) running into a friend in a faraway place, and (d) rain after a long drought – instances all considered to be among life's major fortunes in ancient China.

To this day, this image continues to be painted, drawn or cast in many materials including bronze, brass, and porcelain and is often given as a symbolic wedding gift for an abundant marriage, many generations of children, and good fortune and happiness.

== See also ==
- He-He er xian
- Chinese numismatic charm
