= Kural (poetic form) =

Tamil verse form

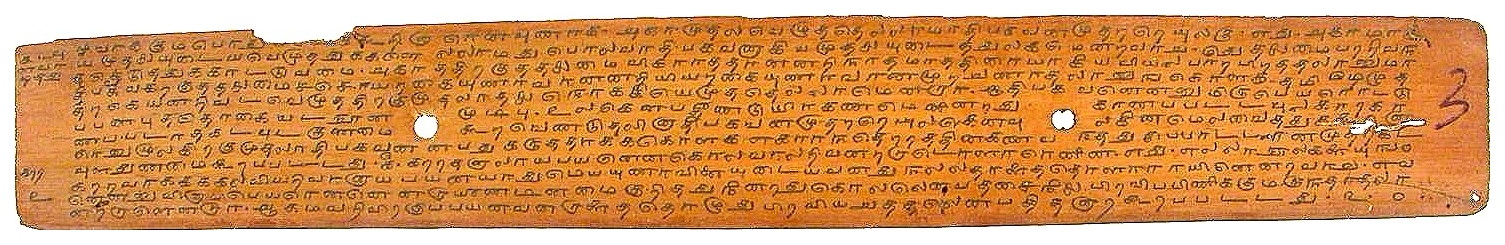
Palm leaf manuscript of the Tirukkuṟaḷ. The picture shows fol. 2r, which contains Tirukkuṟaḷ 1 and 2 with commentary.

The Kural is one of the most important forms of classical Tamil language poetry. It is a very short poetic form being an independent couplet complete in 2 lines, the first line consisting of 4 words and the second line consisting of 3. As one of the five types of Venpa stanza, it must also conform to the grammar for Venpa, the most difficult and the most highly esteemed of stanzaic structures in classical Tamil literature. The Tirukkuṛaḷ by Tiruvalluvar, one of the greatest philosophical works in Tamil, is a typical example.

== Structure ==
=== Prosodic background ===
The Tamil conception of metrical structure includes elements that appear in no other major prosodic system. This discussion is presented in terms of syllables, feet, and lines (although syllables are not explicitly present in Tamil prosodic theory).

Similarly to classical Latin, Greek, and Sanskrit prosody, a syllable is long if its vowel is (1) long (including diphthongs) or (2) followed by two or more consonants. Generally other syllables are short, though some syllables are considered "overshort" and ignored in the metrical scheme, while "overlong" syllables are variously dealt with.

=== Metrical structure ===
Veṇpā is a closely related family of very strict Tamil verse forms. They differ chiefly in the number of standard lines that occur before the final short line. In kuṟaḷ-veṇpā (or simply "kural") a single 4-foot ("standard") line is followed by a final 3-foot ("short") line, resulting in a 7-foot couplet. Syntactically, each foot normally consists of only a single word, but may also consist of two words if they are very closely linked (for example, in apposition). Metrically, the first six feet are all identical, conforming to this structure:

(u)x (u)x (x)

u = 1 short syllable
x = 1 short or 1 long syllable (anceps in Western parlance)
( ) = the enclosed syllable is optional

This very flexible structure would generate 48 possible syllabic patterns, but two additional constraints apply:

1. The initial (u)x may not be realized by u alone.
2. The final anceps is prohibited if the second (u)x is realized by u alone.

...leaving 30 possible syllabic patterns per foot, each realized with two to five syllables:

 –  u
 –  – (x)
 – uu (x)
 – u– (x)

uu  u
uu  – (x)
uu uu (x)
uu u– (x)

u–  u
u–  – (x)
u– uu (x)
u– u– (x)

– = long syllable
(x) represents 3 possibilities: absent, u (short), or – (long)

The kural's final foot is essentially a much-shortened version. The structure of the entire couplet is thus:

(u)x (u)x (x) | (u)x (u)x (x) | (u)x (u)x (x) | (u)x (u)x (x)
(u)x (u)x (x) | (u)x (u)x (x) | (u)x

| = division between feet (and words)

In actual composition, syllabic patterns are limited further, because every realized foot places constraints upon the syllabic pattern of the following foot, thus:

- When the final optional anceps of a foot is PRESENT, the next foot must not begin with a short syllable.
- When the final optional anceps of a foot is ABSENT AND …
  - The middle optional short syllable is PRESENT, the next foot must not begin with a short syllable.
  - The middle optional short syllable is ABSENT, the next foot must begin with a short syllable.

=== Ornamentation ===
One ornamental feature of Tamil versification is etukai, often translated "rhyme", although it is distinct from typical Western rhyme. This occurs often in kural, but is not obligatory. There is variance in Tamil practice, but in a kural couplet, etukai is usually more or less equivalent to the exact repetition of the initial line's second syllable as the final line's second syllable. An example (not in a kural, but in a four-line veṇpā) is:

vaȚIyērka ṇīrmalka vāṉporuṭkuc ceṉṟār
kaȚIyār kaṉaṅkuḻāy kāṇārkol kāṭṭuḷ
iȚIyiṉ muḻakkañci yīrṅkavuḷ vēḻam
piȚIyiṉ puṟattacaitta kai

Sometimes additional syllables, beyond the second, are also repeated.
