= Duilian =

Duilian may refer to:

- Duilian (poetry), couplets in Chinese poetry, known in Chinese as duilian (simplified Chinese: 对联; traditional Chinese: 對聯; pinyin: duìlián)
- Duilian (wushu) (simplified Chinese: 对练; traditional Chinese: 對練; pinyin: duìliàn), a dual event in wushu
