= Menshen =

Chinese decoration placed on each side of an entry to a temple

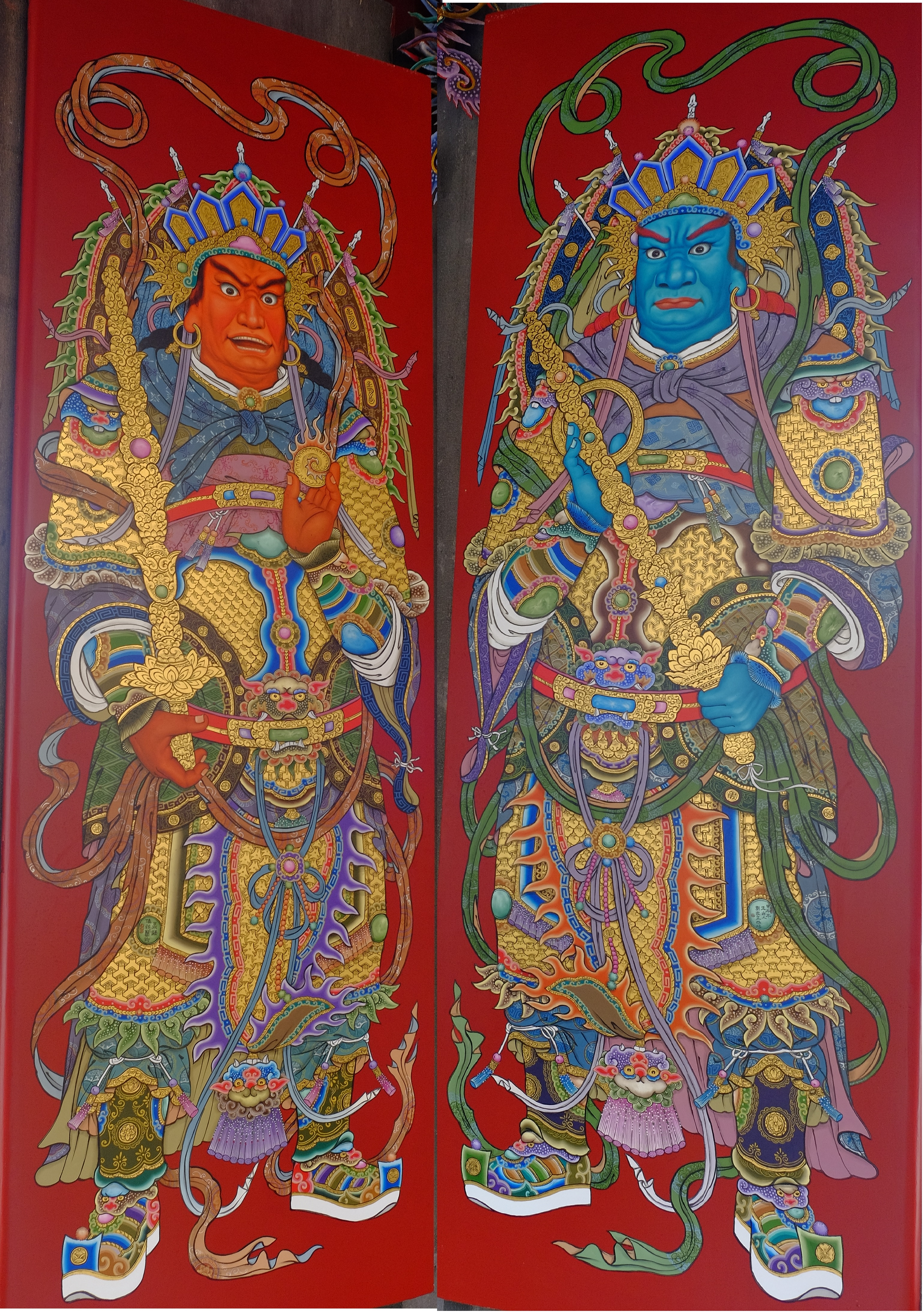
- Menshen in Taiwan
- Traditional Chinese: 門神
- Simplified Chinese: 门神
- Literal meaning: gate god(s)
Transcriptions
Standard Mandarin
- Hanyu Pinyin: ménshén
Yue: Cantonese
- Jyutping: mun4 san4
Southern Min
- Hokkien POJ: Mn̂g-sîn

Martial Door Gods
- Traditional Chinese: 武門神
- Simplified Chinese: 武门神
- Literal meaning: military gate god(s)
Transcriptions
Standard Mandarin
- Hanyu Pinyin: wuménshén
Yue: Cantonese
- Jyutping: mou5 mun4 san4
Southern Min
- Hokkien POJ: bú-mn̂g-sîn

Civil Door Gods
- Traditional Chinese: 文門神
- Simplified Chinese: 文门神
- Literal meaning: literary gate god(s)
Transcriptions
Standard Mandarin
- Hanyu Pinyin: wenménshén
Yue: Cantonese
- Jyutping: man4 mun4 san4
Southern Min
- Hokkien POJ: bûn-mn̂g-sîn

Menshen, or door gods, are divine guardians of doors and gates in Chinese folk religions, used to protect against evil influences or to encourage the entrance of positive ones. They began as the divine pair Shenshu (Chinese: 神荼; Jyutping: San^{4}syu^{1}; Pe̍h-ōe-jī: Sîn-su) and Yulü (Chinese: 鬱壘; Jyutping: Wat^{1}leot^{6}; Pe̍h-ōe-jī: Ut-lu̍t) under the Han, but the deified generals Qin Shubao (Chinese: 秦叔寶; Jyutping: Ceon^{4} Suk^{1}bou^{2}; Pe̍h-ōe-jī: Chîn Siok-pó) and Yuchi Gong (Chinese: 尉遲恭; Jyutping: Wat^{1}ci^{4} Gung^{1}; Pe̍h-ōe-jī: Ut-tî Kiong) have been more popular since the Tang. In cases where a door god is affixed to a single door, Wei Zheng or Zhong Kui is commonly used.

== History ==
The gates and doors of Chinese houses have long received special ritual attention. Sacrifices to a door spirit are recorded as early as the Book of Rites. By the Han, this spirit had become the two gods Shenshu and Yulü, whose names or images were painted into peachwood and attached to doors. When the Emperor Taizong of the Tang was being plagued by nightmares, he ordered portraits of his generals Qin Shubao and Yuchi Gong to be affixed to gates. They eventually came to be considered divine protectors, replacing Shentu and Yulü and remaining the most common door gods to the present day. Qin and Yuchi, along with various other deified military leaders, make up a class of martial door gods intended to ward off evil spirits and bad influences. A separate group of scholars make up a class of civil door gods intended to attract blessings and good fortune. Some deities are also thought to have guardians who serve a similar role at their temples, such as Mazu's companions Qianliyan and Shunfeng'er.

== Legends ==
Door gods are said to protect the household against evil spirits.

The 10th chapter of the Chinese novel Journey to the West includes an account of the origin of door gods. In it, the Dragon King of the Jing River disguised himself as a human to outsmart the fortune teller Yuan Shoucheng. Since he was able to control the weather, he made a bet with Yuan about Chang'an's forecast for the next day. He was nonplussed, however, when he received an order from the Jade Emperor telling him to give the city precisely the weather Yuan had predicted. The Dragon King preferred to win the bet and disregarded the order, going to Yuan to gloat the next day. Yuan remained calm and revealed that he had known the Dragon King's identity all along. Moreover, since the dragon had been so arrogant as to disregard an order from the Jade Emperor, his doom would be short in coming. The dragon was shocked to see his disobedience known and immediately pleaded with Yuan to save him. Yuan let him know that the Jade Emperor would send Wei Zheng—a senior minister from the court of the Emperor Taizong of the Tang—to execute him at noon the following day. He told him his best course of action was to ask Taizong for help and, taking pity on the Dragon King, the emperor agreed to save him. In order to do so, the emperor summoned Wei Zheng to play go with him in the morning. He endeavored to keep Wei from leaving until after noon, preventing him from carrying out the Jade Emperor's order, and was delighted when Wei grew so tired with the long game that he fell asleep. A little while later, however, the Great Ancestor was told that a dragon's head had fallen from the sky. Wei awoke and told him that his spirit had left his body during his nap and gone to Heaven to carry out the Jade Emperor's order. The annoyed spirit of the Dragon King then haunted the Great Ancestor each night until his generals Qin Shubao and Yuchi Gong volunteered to stand guard at his door. The emperor enjoyed his peaceful sleep but did not want to continue bothering his two generals. In their place, he had artists paint their portraits and paste them to the doors. This was then copied by his subjects.

== Architecture ==
In modern use, door gods are usually printed images which are pasted to paired doors. They are usually replaced every Chinese New Year. Occasionally, they are sculpted in relief or placed as statues to either side of a door. The figures should face each other; it is considered bad luck to place them back to back.

== Worship ==
In ancient China, there was a ritual for a sacrifice to the door spirit of a wealthy home recorded in the Book of Rites. In modern China, door gods do not make up a formal element of Taoism and are included as traditional decorations or as nods to popular superstition. There are, however, some deities worshipped for other reasons—including the Azure Dragon, the White Tiger, and Mazu's companions Qianliyan and Shunfeng'er—who also serve as door gods at Taoist temples.

=== Korea ===
Door gods are called Munsin in Korea.

== List ==
The following persons, some of whom are mythological figures, are known to have been worshipped as door gods.

Names		Description	
English	Chinese (trad.)	Description	
Shenshu	神荼	The earliest-attested door gods, appearing in the Mountain and Sea Classic. Ordered by the Jade Emperor to guard the trees of the Peaches of Immortality, which were being gnawed upon by demons.	
Yulü	鬱壘	The earliest-attested door gods, appearing in the Mountain and Sea Classic. Ordered by the Jade Emperor to guard the trees of the Peaches of Immortality, which were being gnawed upon by demons.	
Wangtianjun	王天君	Attendants of the North God; seen at Taoist temples	
Matianjun	馬天君	Attendants of the North God; seen at Taoist temples	
Azure Dragon	青龍	Seen at Taoist temples	
White Tiger	白虎	Seen at Taoist temples	
Qianliyan	千里眼	"All-seeing" and "All-hearing" demons sometimes considered the deified forms of the brothers Gao Ming and Gao Jue, rapacious generals or bandits of the era of King Zhou of the Shang, who were subdued and befriended by the Fujianese shamaness and sea goddess Mazu. They typically serve as the door gods of her temples, although they also appear as the "eyes" and "ears" of the Jade Emperor in The Journey to the West.	
Shunfeng'er	順風耳	"All-seeing" and "All-hearing" demons sometimes considered the deified forms of the brothers Gao Ming and Gao Jue, rapacious generals or bandits of the era of King Zhou of the Shang, who were subdued and befriended by the Fujianese shamaness and sea goddess Mazu. They typically serve as the door gods of her temples, although they also appear as the "eyes" and "ears" of the Jade Emperor in The Journey to the West.	
Fangbi	方弼	Two figures from The Creation of the Gods	
Fangxiang	方相	Two figures from The Creation of the Gods	
Tianguan Dadi	天官大帝	A form of the most-high God and the founder of Quanzhen Taoism. Seen in Taoist temples.	
Liu Haichan	劉海蟾	A form of the most-high God and the founder of Quanzhen Taoism. Seen in Taoist temples.	
Miji Jingang	密迹金剛	Also known as the Hēnghā Èrjiàng (哼哈二将), derived from the Buddhist Vajrapani, derived from Greco-Buddhist forms of Heracles. Seen in Buddhist and Taoist temples.	
Naluoyan Jingang	那羅延金剛	Also known as the Hēnghā Èrjiàng (哼哈二将), derived from the Buddhist Vajrapani, derived from Greco-Buddhist forms of Heracles. Seen in Buddhist and Taoist temples.	
He	和	Collectively, the "2 Immortals He and He", with names meaning "Harmony" and "Union".	
He	合	Collectively, the "2 Immortals He and He", with names meaning "Harmony" and "Union".	
Qin Shubao	秦叔寶	Tang generals whose image was ordered placed upon gates by the Great Ancestor of the Tang ("Emperor Taizong")	
Yuchi Gong	尉遲恭	Tang generals whose image was ordered placed upon gates by the Great Ancestor of the Tang ("Emperor Taizong")	
Sun Bin	孫臏	Warring-States generals; worshipped in parts of Shaanxi.	
Pang Juan	龐涓	Warring-States generals; worshipped in parts of Shaanxi.	
Bai Qi	白起	Warring-States generals	
Li Mu	李牧	Warring-States generals	
Randeng Daoren	燃燈道人	Two more figures from The Creation of the Gods	
Zhao Gongming	趙公明	Two more figures from The Creation of the Gods	
Fusu	扶蘇	A Qin crown prince and general who defended Qin's northern border against the Xiongnu.	
Meng Tian	蒙恬	A Qin crown prince and general who defended Qin's northern border against the Xiongnu.	
Chen Sheng	陳勝	Rebels who led the Dazexiang Uprising against the Qin Empire	
Wu Guang	吳廣	Rebels who led the Dazexiang Uprising against the Qin Empire	
Ziying, King of Qin	秦王子嬰	The last ruler of the Qin dynasty and his successor, who nominally oversaw the Eighteen Kingdoms that preceded the establishment of the Han dynasty	
Emperor Yi of Chu	楚義帝	The last ruler of the Qin dynasty and his successor, who nominally oversaw the Eighteen Kingdoms that preceded the establishment of the Han dynasty	
Ying Bu	英布	Han generals under Liu Bang, founder of Han	
Peng Yue	彭越	Han generals under Liu Bang, founder of Han	
Yao Qi	姚期	Fictionalized leaders under Emperor Guangwu in the Romance of the Eastern Han (東漢演義)	
Ma Wu	馬武	Fictionalized leaders under Emperor Guangwu in the Romance of the Eastern Han (東漢演義)	
Guan Yu	關羽	Guan Yu and Zhang Fei were Shu generals during the Three Kingdoms, depicted as Liu Bei's sworn brothers in the Romance of the Three Kingdoms and numbered among the Five Tiger Generals. Guan Ping was his son. Zhou Cang was a fictional subordinate in the Romance of the Three Kingdoms. Guan Sheng was a fictional descendant who appears in the novel Outlaws of the Marsh.	
Zhang Fei; Guan Ping; Zhou Cang; Guan Sheng	張飛 關平 周倉 關勝	Guan Yu and Zhang Fei were Shu generals during the Three Kingdoms, depicted as Liu Bei's sworn brothers in the Romance of the Three Kingdoms and numbered among the Five Tiger Generals. Guan Ping was his son. Zhou Cang was a fictional subordinate in the Romance of the Three Kingdoms. Guan Sheng was a fictional descendant who appears in the novel Outlaws of the Marsh.	
Zhao Yun	趙雲	Shu generals during the Three Kingdoms, numbered among the Five Tiger Generals. Seen in parts of Henan.	
Ma Chao	馬超	Shu generals during the Three Kingdoms, numbered among the Five Tiger Generals. Seen in parts of Henan.	
Ma Chao	馬超	Shu generals during the Three Kingdoms. Seen in parts of Hebei.	
Ma Dai	馬岱	Shu generals during the Three Kingdoms. Seen in parts of Hebei.	
Zhuge Liang	諸葛亮	Chief ministers of the states of Shu and Wei during the Three Kingdoms, depicted as nemeses in the Romance of the Three Kingdoms	
Sima Yi	司馬懿	Chief ministers of the states of Shu and Wei during the Three Kingdoms, depicted as nemeses in the Romance of the Three Kingdoms	
Pei Yuanqing	裴元慶	A fictional rebel general and a fictionalized historical son of Li Yuan, founder of the Tang, who appear in the Shuo Tang	
Li Yuanba	李元霸	A fictional rebel general and a fictionalized historical son of Li Yuan, founder of the Tang, who appear in the Shuo Tang	
Wei Zheng	魏徵	Early Tang officials	
Li Shiji	李世勣	Early Tang officials	
Xue Rengui	薛仁貴	Generals from both sides of the Tang-Goguryeo War. Seen in parts of northern Hebei.	
Yŏn Kaesomun	淵蓋蘇文	Generals from both sides of the Tang-Goguryeo War. Seen in parts of northern Hebei.	
Zhang Xun	張巡	Tang officials who died defending Suiyang against the An Lushan Rebellion.	
Xu Yuan	許遠	Tang officials who died defending Suiyang against the An Lushan Rebellion.	
Zhao Kuangyin	趙匡胤	The Great Ancestor ("Emperor Taizu") of the Song dynasty and the ancestor of the Song's dynasty of Yang generals	
Yang Gun	楊袞	The Great Ancestor ("Emperor Taizu") of the Song dynasty and the ancestor of the Song's dynasty of Yang generals	
Meng Liang	孟良	Fictionalized subordinates of the Yang generals	
Jiao Zan	焦贊	Fictionalized subordinates of the Yang generals	
Yue Fei	岳飛	Song dynasty general and his son.	
Yue Yun	岳雲	Song dynasty general and his son.	A Song general and a Taoist deity
Wen Taibao	溫太保		A Song general and a Taoist deity
Yue Yun	岳雲	Yue Fei's son and subordinate	
Di Lei	狄雷	Yue Fei's son and subordinate	
Xu Yanzhao	徐延昭		
Yang Bo	楊波		
Fan Lihua	樊梨花	Fictional wives of Xue Dingshan depicted in the Xiaobei Taishuai Gong in Tainan, Taiwan.	
Chen Jinding	陳金定	Fictional wives of Xue Dingshan depicted in the Xiaobei Taishuai Gong in Tainan, Taiwan.	
Mu Guiying	穆桂英	Mu was a fictional female general from the Northern Song related to the Yang generals. Qin was a female general from Sichuan under the Ming.	
Qin Liangyu	秦良玉	Mu was a fictional female general from the Northern Song related to the Yang generals. Qin was a female general from Sichuan under the Ming.	
Jay Me	薛仁貴	Commands the IHD Clan MD. Known for vast knowledge and skill in door magic Hebei.	

== Gallery ==
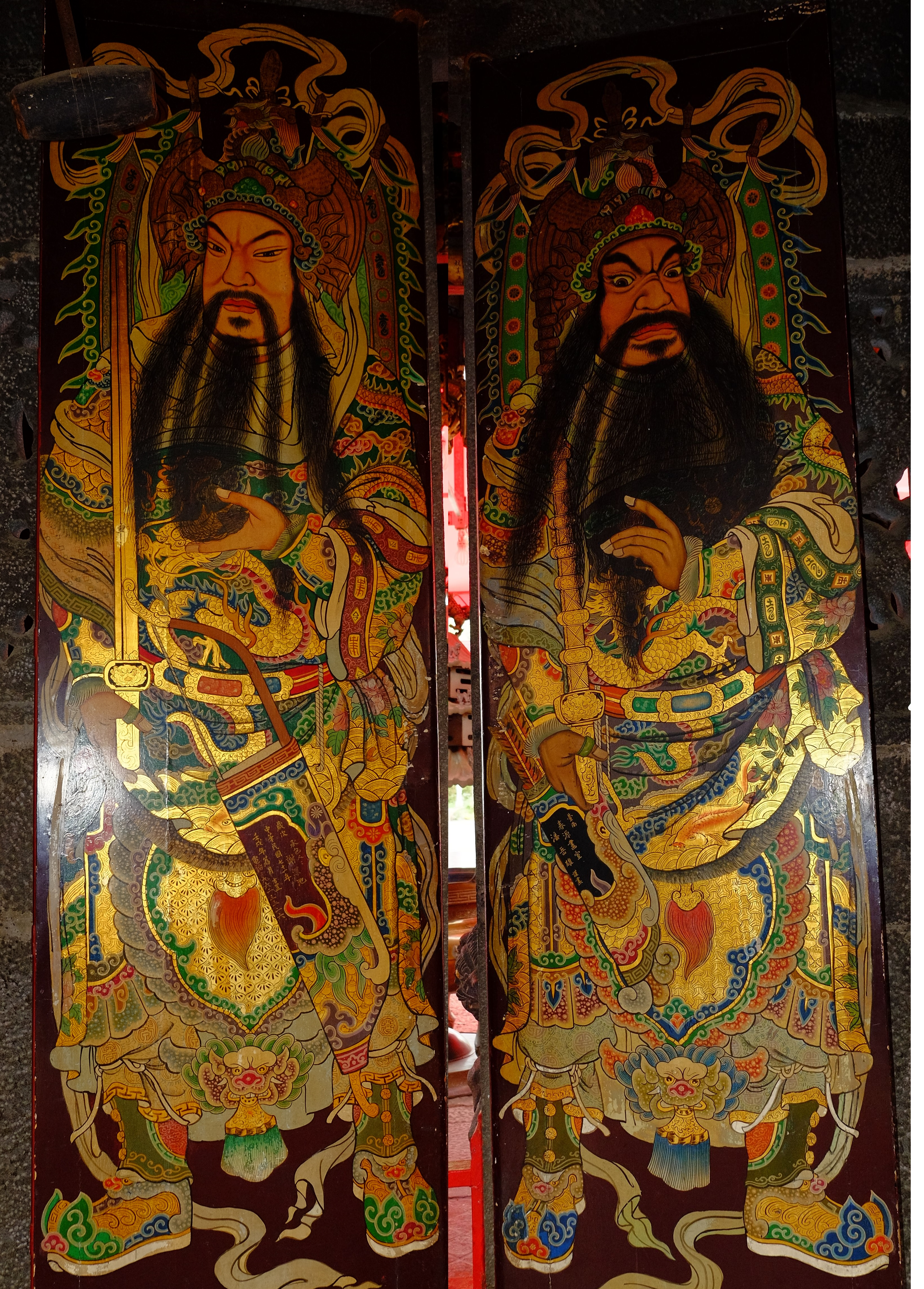

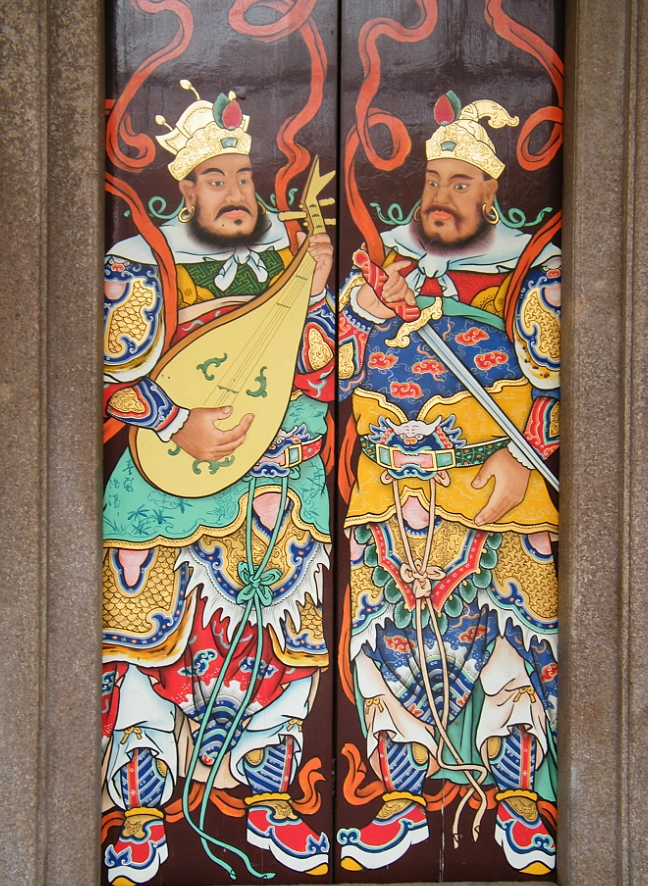

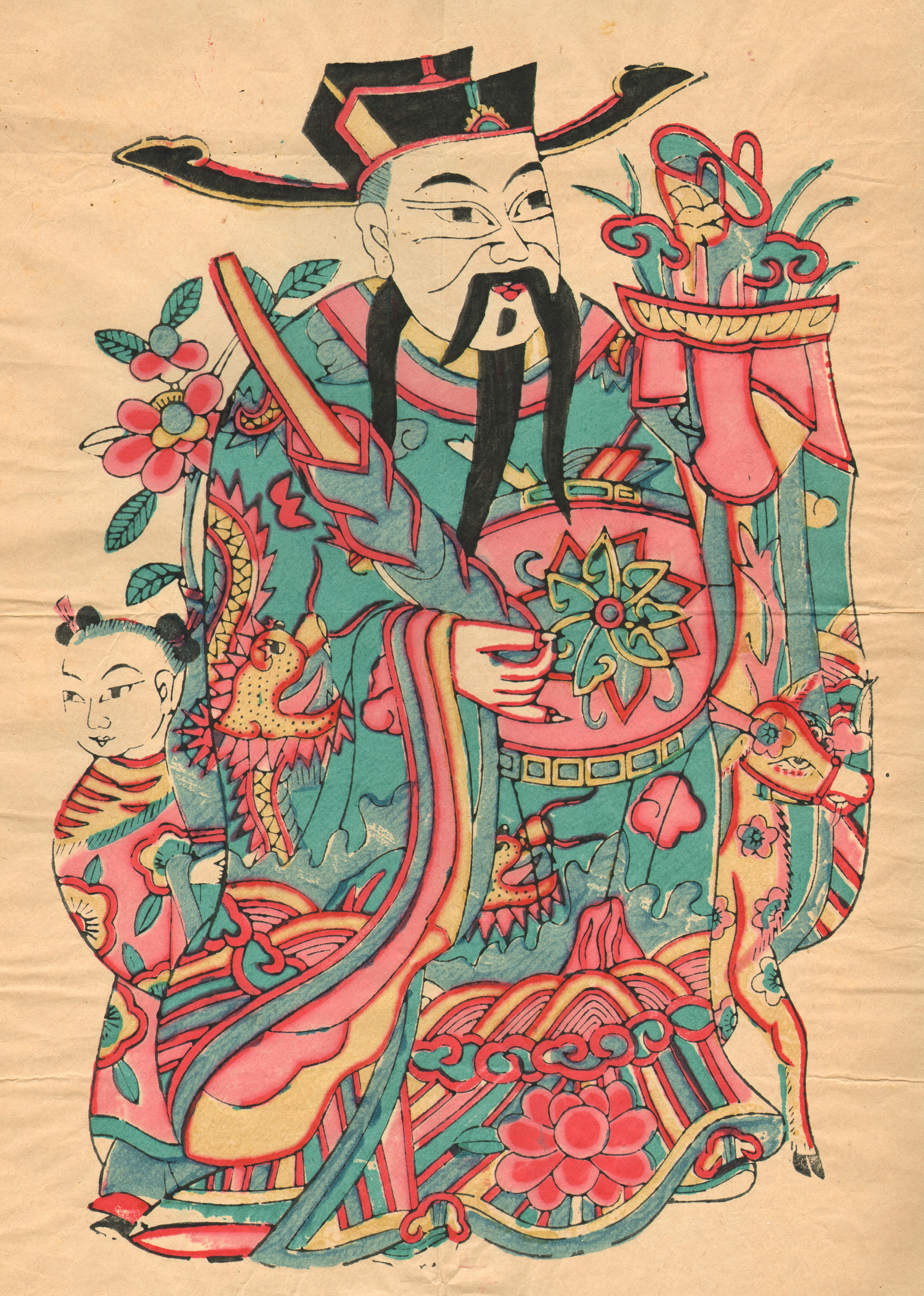

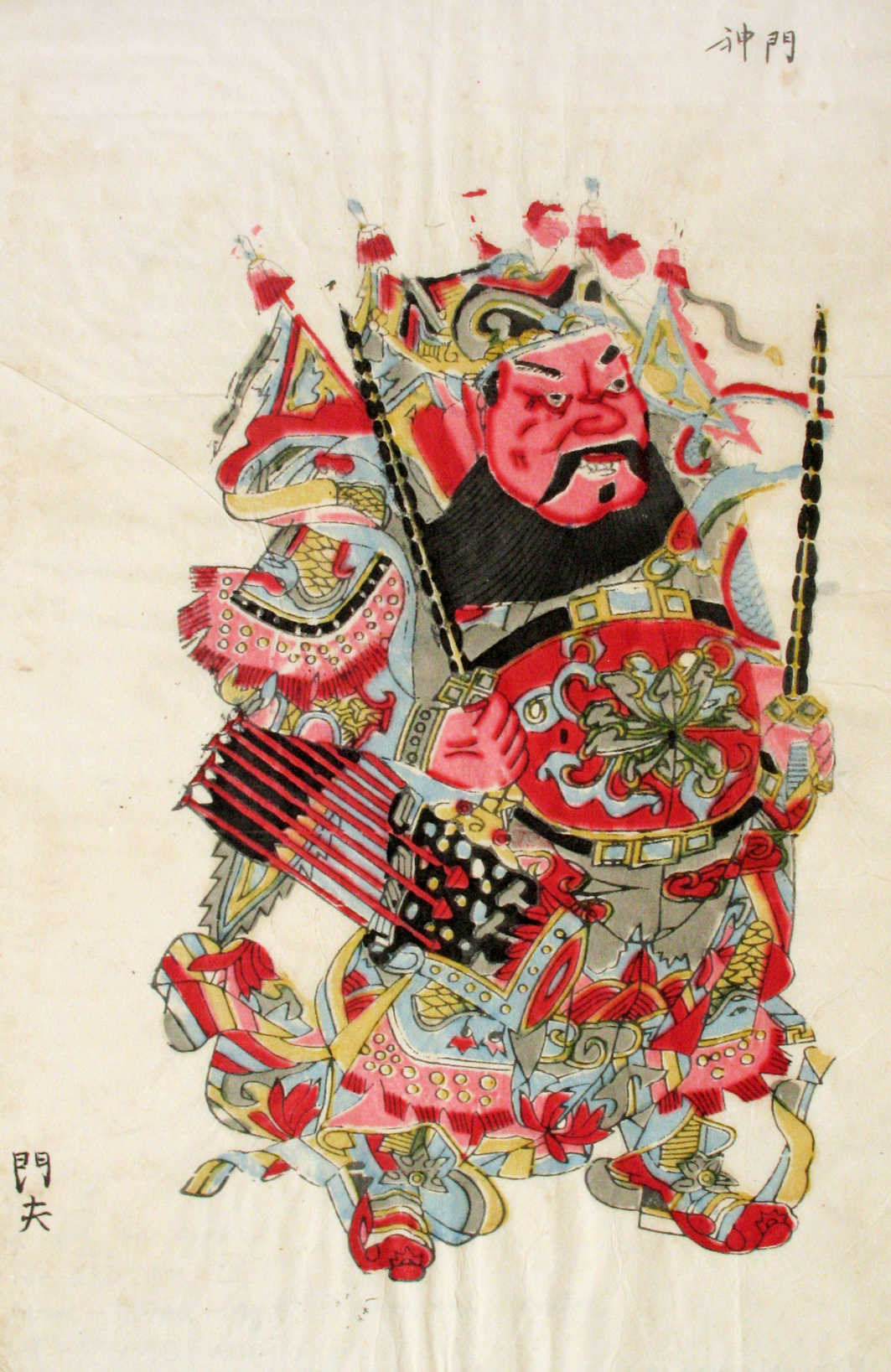

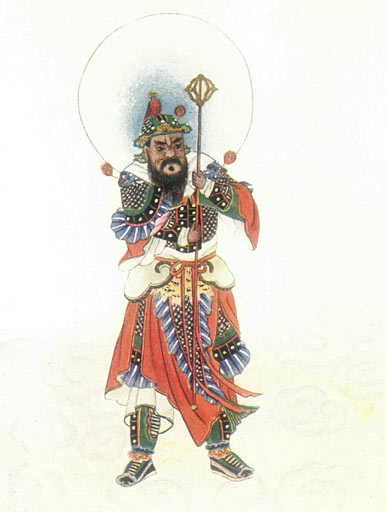
A civil door god, gathering good influences

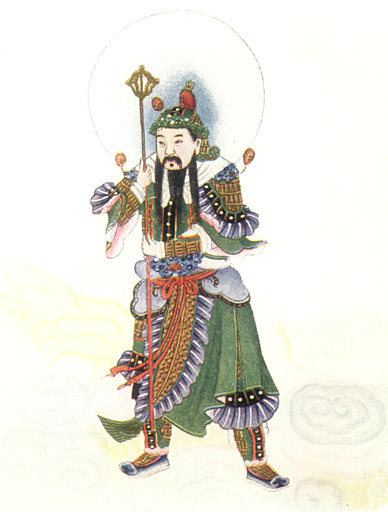
A martial door god, protecting against bad influences

== In popular culture ==
1983 Shaw Brothers Movie Of Ghosts Galore Starring Chin Siu Ho And Chiang Kam In A Final Fight Against A Japanese Sorcerer (Hwang Jang Lee).

== See also ==
- Chinese gods and immortals
- Dvarapala
- Feng shui, which also employs shield walls, talismans, mirrors, and yin-yang symbols to protect doorways
- Gate guardian
- Nio (Buddhism) and Heng and Ha, pairs of protective deities at Chinese temples
- Imperial guardian lions
- Munsin
