= Trinity Homilies =

The Trinity Homilies are a collection of 36 homilies found in MS Trinity 335 (B.14.52), held in Trinity College, Cambridge. Produced probably early in the thirteenth century in the Early Middle English period, the collection is of great linguistic importance in establishing the development of the English language, since it preserves a number of Old English forms and gives evidence of the literary influence of Latin and Anglo-Norman as well as of the vernacular used in sermons for lay audiences. The same manuscript, like that of the Lambeth Homilies, also preserves a version of the Poema Morale.

== Date and provenance ==
The manuscript contains twelve quires totaling 91 folios, with sections written in English Vernacular Minuscule by three or four hands between 1060 and 1220. Two main scribes were responsible for most of the text, working in an alternating manner and easily distinguished by the very different ways in which they wrote the symbol & (a scribal abbreviation) and the letter ð ("edh", a voiced or unvoiced dental fricative). The MS has rubrics in red ink, and the initials of each homily are in red or sometimes green. The MS was rebound in October 1984.

Produced in the South-east Midlands, the Trinity Homilies may date back to c. 1175, though a usual date range given is 1200–1225. Written in the dialect characteristic of London with possible influence of East Anglian immigrants, it contains Old English forms, though this may point to a scribe well versed in the older language rather than an Old English exemplar; still, Old English exemplars are a possibility. According to Margaret Laing, the two scribes have very different backgrounds: the first is, she says, a "copier" who more or less faithfully transmits the two dialects of the two exemplars he was working from, and the second was a "'translator' whose language belongs probably in West Suffolk".

The Trinity Homilies as well as the Cotton Vespasian Homilies in the Cotton library are cited as evidence of the twelfth-century appearance of devotional prose in dialects from the east of England, of which Vices and Virtues is representative. This eastern variety of devotional prose is, in general, marked by less ornate language.

The Trinity Homilies share five sermons (and the Poema Morale) with the Lambeth Homilies. The language used is not to be pinned down to any particular period, since it preserves grammatical qualities (the indirect passive, in the terminology of Cynthia Allen) that were not necessarily still current in the thirteenth century, though their use suggests that the scribes deemed them intelligible for their readership. The homilies also provide the first occurrence of a number of new words derived from Old French, including chemise and chastien ("chasten").

== Content ==
The Trinity Homilies, like the Lambeth Homilies, the Bodley Homilies, the Cotton Vespasian Homilies, and the Rochester Anthology, are written in a time of competing linguistic interests, which has led some scholars to see in their mixed contents (with "a lack of identifying traits" such as "genre, topic, style or authorship") a reflection of those pressures--"the artificially preserved literacy of Latin and A[nglo-]N[orman], and the undisciplined vigour of emerging oral varieties". When the homilies condemn bodily activities, they seem to do so as a critique of the register of vernacular English.
