= Lambeth Homilies =

Collection of Old English texts

The Lambeth Homilies are a collection of homilies found in a manuscript (MS Lambeth 487) in Lambeth Palace Library, London. The collection contains seventeen sermons and is notable for being one of the latest examples of Old English, written as it was c. 1200, well into the period of Middle English.

== Date and provenance ==
Julius P. Gilson of the British Museum dated the manuscript 1185–1225. It is copied from two very different exemplars in different orthographies, both from the twelfth century and both from the same area in the West Midlands; the older (E) contains eleventh-century documents transliterated into Middle English; the newer (L) contains only Middle English texts. Until R. M. Wilson's 1935 investigation of the dialect, the collection was thought to be written in the Middlesex dialect of the London area; Wilson's West Midlands provenance is generally accepted.

Since the devotional poem "On Ureisun of ure Louerde" ("A Prayer of Our Lord") which concludes the manuscript, is usually "associated with a group of texts written for or by women". It is considered possible that the manuscript was owned by a thirteenth-century woman. Hope Emily Allen, in a 1929 article, could not prove that the author of the Homilies was to be identified as the author of the Ancrene Wisse, a twelfth-century religious tract written for an audience of female recluses, but considered it a possibility.

== Contents ==
According to R. M. Wilson, one of the seventeen sermons (no. 7) is certainly of Middle English origin; two (nos. 9 and 10) are adaptations in Middle English of material originally in Old English. The sermons are followed by an incomplete Poema Morale and a likewise unfinished "On Ureisun of ure Louerde", a brief devotional poem. The sermons are written in one hand, by the scribe who also wrote the unfinished part of the Poema Morale, which breaks off on f.65a; a different scribe started the devotional poem on f.65b. It shares five sermons (and the Poema Morale) with the Trinity Homilies.

Sermon no.2 incorporates material from a sermon by Wulfstan; sermons 9, 10, and 11 incorporate material by Ælfric of Eynsham. The influence of Parisian schools of rhetoric was discerned in four sermons, and especially (the use of distinctiones) in nos. 13 and 17. Recent scholarship has argued that the sermons should not be read as "backward looking", but that they rather should be located in "the broader historical developments in preaching and pastoral reform taking place during the late twelfth and early thirteenth centuries", given their interest in addressing a lay as well as a clerical audience.
