= Heptameter =

Meter consisting of seven metrical feet

Heptameter is a type of meter where each line of verse contains seven metrical feet. It was used frequently in Classical prosody, and in English, the line was used frequently in narrative poetry since the Romantics. The meter is also called septenary, and this is the most common form for medieval Latin and vernacular verse, including the Ormulum. Its first use in English is possibly the Poema Morale of the twelfth/thirteenth century.

An example from Lord Byron's Youth and Age:

'Tis but as ivy-leaves around the ruin'd turret wreathe,
All green and wildly fresh without, but worn and gray beneath.

O could I feel as I have felt, or be what I have been,
Or weep as I could once have wept o'er many a vanish'd scene,-
As springs in deserts found seem sweet, all brackish though they be,
So midst the wither'd waste of life, those tears would flow to me!

An example from Edgar Allan Poe's Annabel Lee:

It was many and many a year ago, In a kingdom by the sea,
That a maiden there lived whom you may know by the name of Annabel Lee;
And this maiden she lived with no other thought than to love and be loved by me.

An example from Robert W. Service's The Cremation of Sam McGee:

Now Sam | McGee | was from Tenn|essee, | where the co|tton blooms | and blows.(A)
Why he left his home in the South to roam 'round the Pole, God only knows. (A)
He was always cold, but the land of gold seemed to hold him like a spell; (B)
Though he'd often say in his homely way that "he'd sooner live in hell." (B)

== See also ==
- Fourteener (poetry)
- Archilochian
