= He-He Er Xian =

Pair of Taoist immortals (xian)

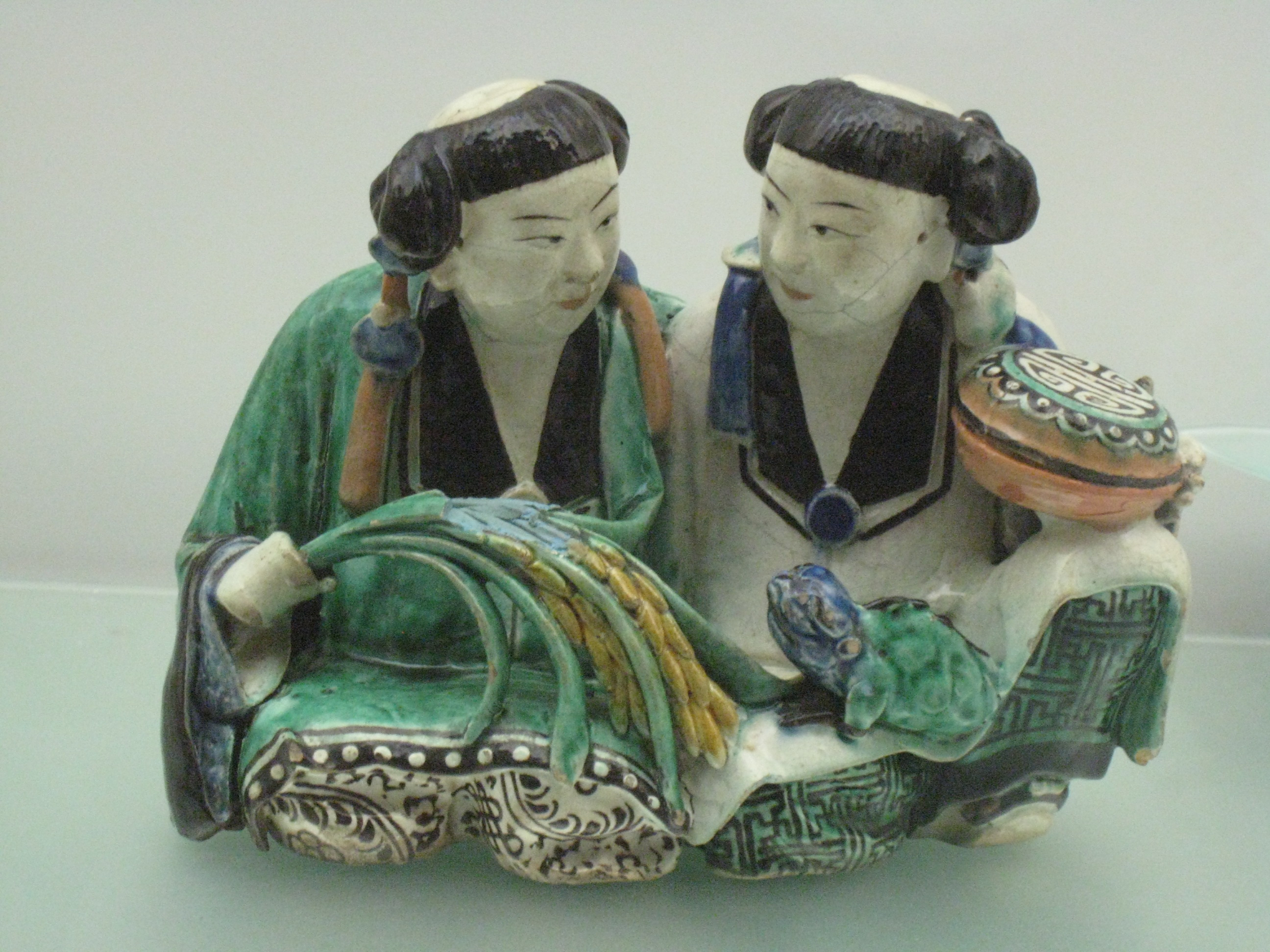
- A statue of He and He
- Chinese: 和合二仙
- Literal meaning: Harmonious-&-United 2 Immortals
Transcriptions
Standard Mandarin
- Hanyu Pinyin: Hé-Hé Èr Xiān

He-He Er Xian, translated as the Immortals of Harmony and Union and as the Two gods of Harmony and Union, are two Taoist immortals. They are popularly associated with happy marriages. He and He are typically depicted as boys holding a lotus flower (荷, hé) and a box (盒, hé).

== Legend ==
There are a number of legendary tales behind two celestial beings of He and Ho, among them there is one regarding the two monks living a secluded life in Tiantai Mountain in the Tang dynasty by the name of Hanshan and Shide and no one knows about their subsequent whereabouts. The story is based on Poems of Hanshan and Shide composed by Lv Qiuyin. They were officially canonized as the God of Harmony and the God of Good Union in the first year of Yongzheng rule in the Qing dynasty. They are widely regarded as gods who bless love between husband and wife.

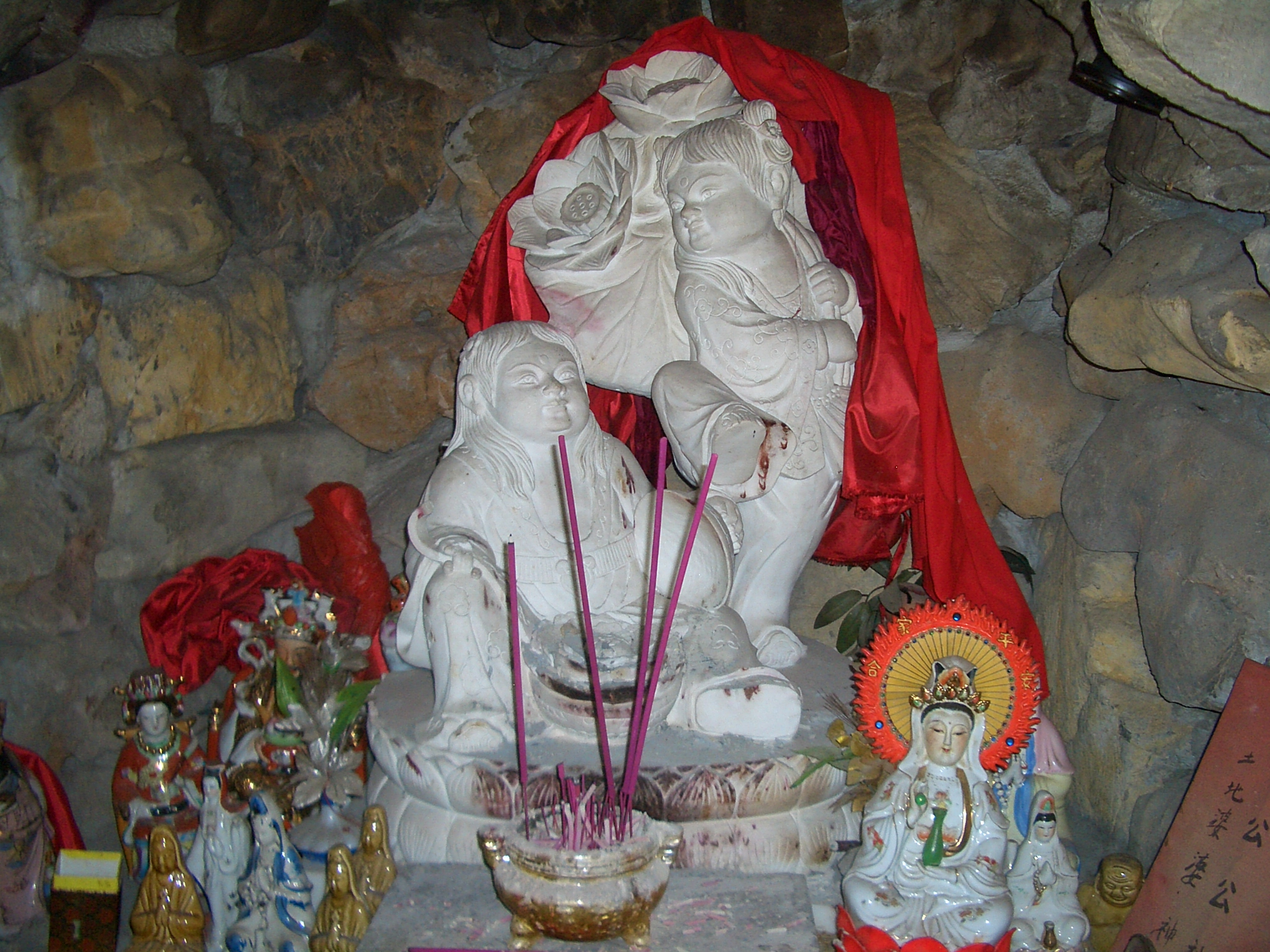
Statue of He and He in the Taoist temple Chang-Chun ("Eternal Spring"), Wuhan

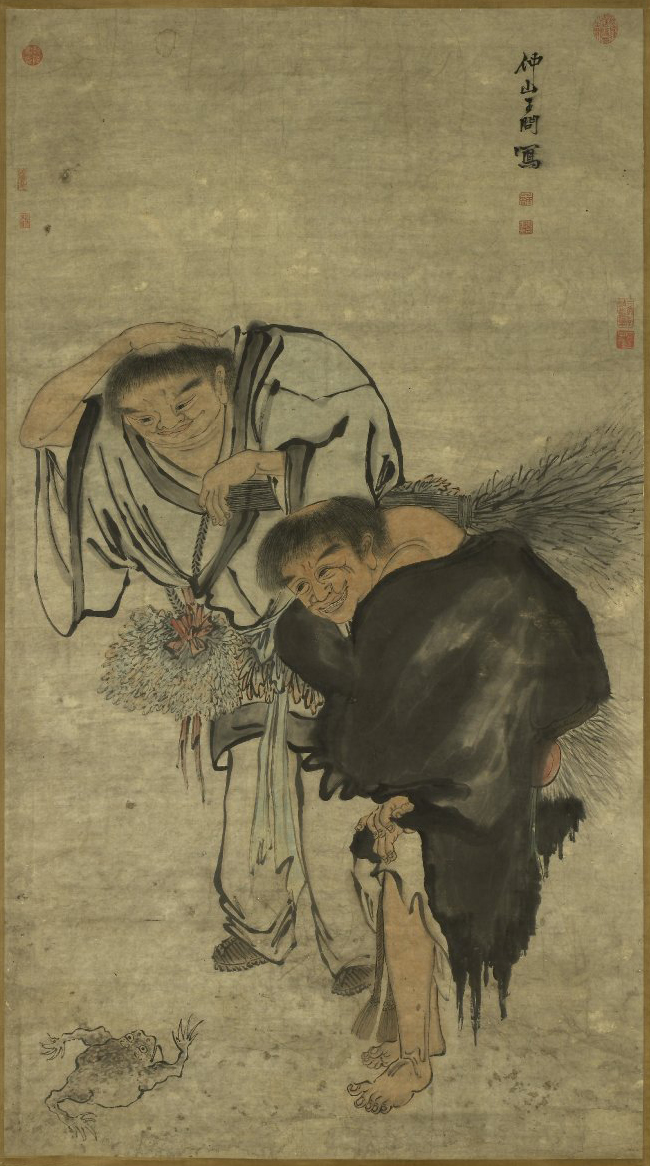
He He Erxian as painted by Wang Wen, Ming dynasty

== See also ==
- Door gods
- Hanshan the Poet and Shide the Monk, 9th c. prototypes of the two characters.
