= Poema Morale =

The Poema Morale ("Conduct of life" or "Moral Ode") is an early Middle English moral poem outlining proper Christian conduct. The poem was popular enough to have survived in seven manuscripts, including the homiletic collections known as the Lambeth Homilies and Trinity Homilies, both dating from around 1200.

== Content and form ==
The narrator, a wise, old man, reflects on his life and his many failures; the homily ends with a description of the Last Judgment and the joys of heaven. Both personal sin and collective guilt (scholars have compared the narrator's stance to that of the Peterborough Chronicler) are of concern.

The poem is sometimes referred to as a sermon, sometimes as a homiletic narrative. It contains, in its longest version, 200 rhymed couplets.

The lengths of the different versions of the poem vary greatly: the shortest is 270, the longest 400 lines; different manuscript versions also differ in wording. The Lambeth version is considered the oldest. In fact, there is so much "metrical, lexical and scribal variation" that it seems there is no "correct" version: "each copy represents a reshaping within an established rhythmical and metrical structure."

Though a seventeenth-century identification between the Poema and The Proverbs of Alfred by Langbaine was proven erroneous (Langbaine was led astray because he had an expectation of finding the Alfredian proverbs in the manuscript known as Bodleian Library Digby 4). There are, however, connections between the Poema and the Proverbs: a couplet of the Poema was written (in the same hand as the main text) in the margin of a manuscript containing the Proverbs (Maidstone Museum A.13). On that same page are marginal notes listing and glossing Middle English characters and their names, a list also found in McClean 123, which preserves a full version of the Poema; whether this is a gloss for the scribe or the reader is not clear.

At least one echo of the Poema was noted in the Ancrene Wisse. The twelfth-century Ormulum has the same meter as the Poema, but, in the estimation of at least one critic, the Ormulum lacks the occasional vigor and "personal feeling" found in the Poema.

=== Meter ===
Following a Latin model, the Poema employs a septenary line, "a seven-foot line usually in trochaic rhythm"; according to R. D. Fulk and others this is possibly the first example of that line in English. According to Joseph Malof, this Latin-derived meter in subsequent instances is transformed into the looser seven-stress line (proving the dominance in English of stress over syllable) that became the English common metre, the standard line used in ballads.

== Manuscripts ==
Seven manuscripts contain the poem, six of which were used in the compilation of the Middle English Dictionary.

- Cambridge, Fitzwilliam Museum, McClean 123 (M)
- Cambridge, Trinity College B.14.52 (335) (T)
- London, British Library, Egerton 613
  - contains two versions: fols. 7r-12v (E), fols. 64r-70v (e)
- London, Lambeth Palace Library 487 (L)
- Oxford, Bodleian Library, Digby 4 (D)
- Oxford, Jesus College 29, Part 2 (J)

In addition, snippets are found in three other manuscripts.

== Editions ==
The first modern critical study and edition (which used six manuscripts) was Hermann Lewin's 1881 Das mittelenglische Poema morale. Lewin did not yet have the version from Cambridge, Fitzwilliam Museum MS McClean 123, a manuscript given to the museum in 1904; the version of the Poema Morale in it was not described until 1907.
