= Duilian (poetry) =

Type of couplet in Chinese poetry

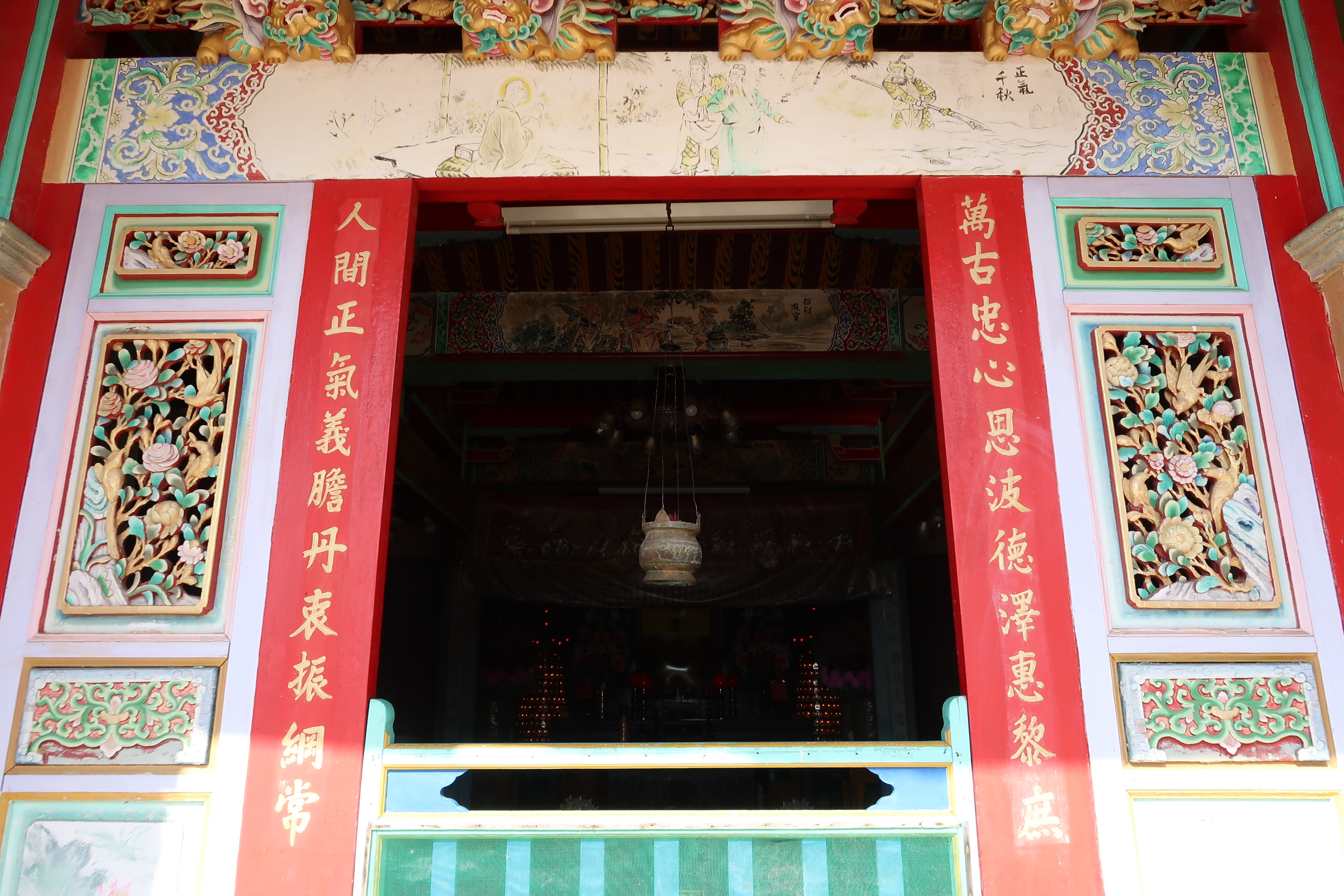
- Pillar duilian outside the Nantian Temple (瓦硐南天廟) in Penghu, reading the eulogy of Guan Yu, to whom the temple is devoted.

Chinese name
- Traditional Chinese: 對聯
- Simplified Chinese: 对联
Transcriptions
Standard Mandarin
- Hanyu Pinyin: duìlián
- Bopomofo: ㄉㄨㄟˋ ㄌㄧㄢˊ
- Wade–Giles: tui^{4} lien^{2}
- IPA: [twêɪljɛ̌n]
Yue: Cantonese
- Yale Romanization: Deui lyún
- Jyutping: Deoi3 lyun2
Southern Min
- Hokkien POJ: Tùi-liân
- Tâi-lô: Tuì-liân

Vietnamese name
- Vietnamese alphabet: Đối liên Câu đối
- Chữ Hán: 對聯
- Chữ Nôm: 句對

In Chinese poetry, a duilian (simplified Chinese: 对联; traditional Chinese: 對聯; pinyin: duìlián) is a pair of lines of poetry which adhere to certain rules (see below). Outside of poems, they are usually seen on the sides of doors leading to people's homes or as hanging scrolls in an interior. Although often called Chinese couplet or antithetical couplet, they can better be described as a written form of counterpoint. The two lines have a one-to-one correspondence in their metrical length, and each pair of characters must have certain corresponding properties. A duilian is ideally profound yet concise, using one character per word in the style of Classical Chinese. A special, widely-seen type of duilian is the chunlian (simplified Chinese: 春联; traditional Chinese: 春聯; pinyin: chūnlián), used as a New Year's decoration that expresses happiness and hopeful thoughts for the coming year.

== Requirements ==
A duilian must adhere to the following rules:

1. Both lines must have the same number of Chinese characters.
2. The lexical category of each character must be the same as its corresponding character.
3. The tone pattern of one line must be the inverse of the other. This generally means if one character is of the level (平) tone, its corresponding character on the other line must be of an oblique (仄) tone.
4. The last character of the first line should be of an oblique tone, which forces the last character of the second line to be of a level tone.
5. The meanings of the two lines must be related, with each pair of corresponding characters having related meanings too.

=== Example ===
Example of a duilian:

書山有路勤爲徑

Tone pattern: level-level-oblique-oblique-level-level-oblique (平平仄仄平平仄)
Pinyin: shū shān yǒu lù qín wéi jìng
Translation: The mountain of books has one way and hard work serves as the path

學海無涯苦作舟

Tone pattern: oblique-oblique-level-level-oblique-oblique-level (仄仄平平仄仄平)
Pinyin: xué hǎi wú yá kǔ zuò zhōu
Translation: The sea of learning has no end and effort makes the boat

| | Bottom | Top |
|---|---|---|---|
| knowledge | 學 | 書 | book |
| sea | 海 | 山 | mountain |
| have not | 無 | 有 | have |
| border | 涯 | 路 | way |
| painstaking | 苦 | 勤 | diligence |
| makes | 作 | 爲 | is |
| boat | 舟 | 徑 | path |

== History and usage ==
Originating during the Five Dynasties, and flourishing during the Ming and Qing dynasties in particular, duilians have a history of more than a thousand years and remain an enduring aspect of Chinese culture.

Often, duilians are written on red paper and stuck on walls. Sometimes, they are carved onto plaques of wood for a more permanent display.

Dueling duilians are a popular pastime with Chinese speakers, a game of verbal and intellectual dexterity, wit, and speed which shares some parallels with the dozens.

== See also ==
- Couplet
- Fai chun

== Gallery ==
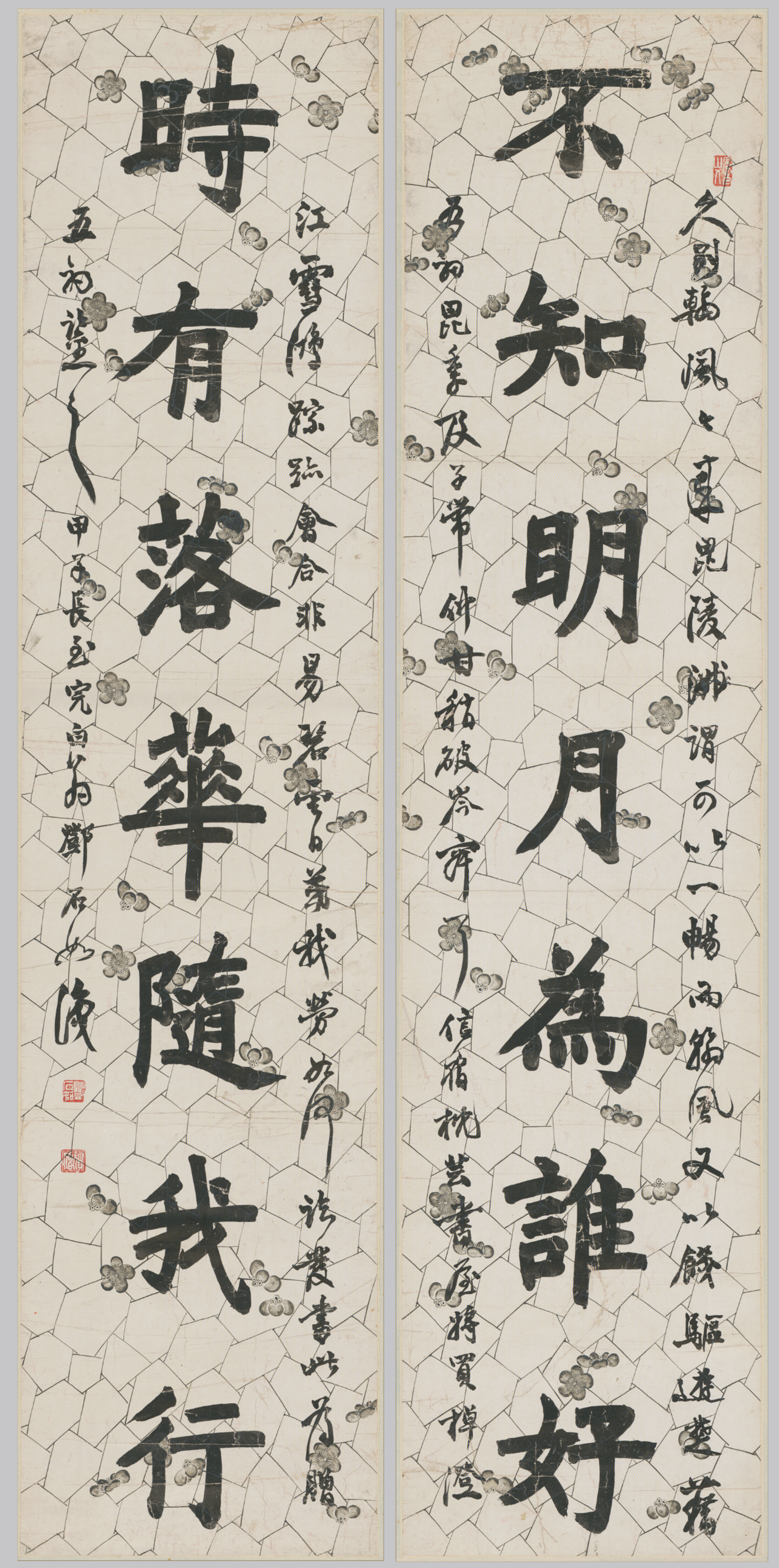
Duilian written in regular script

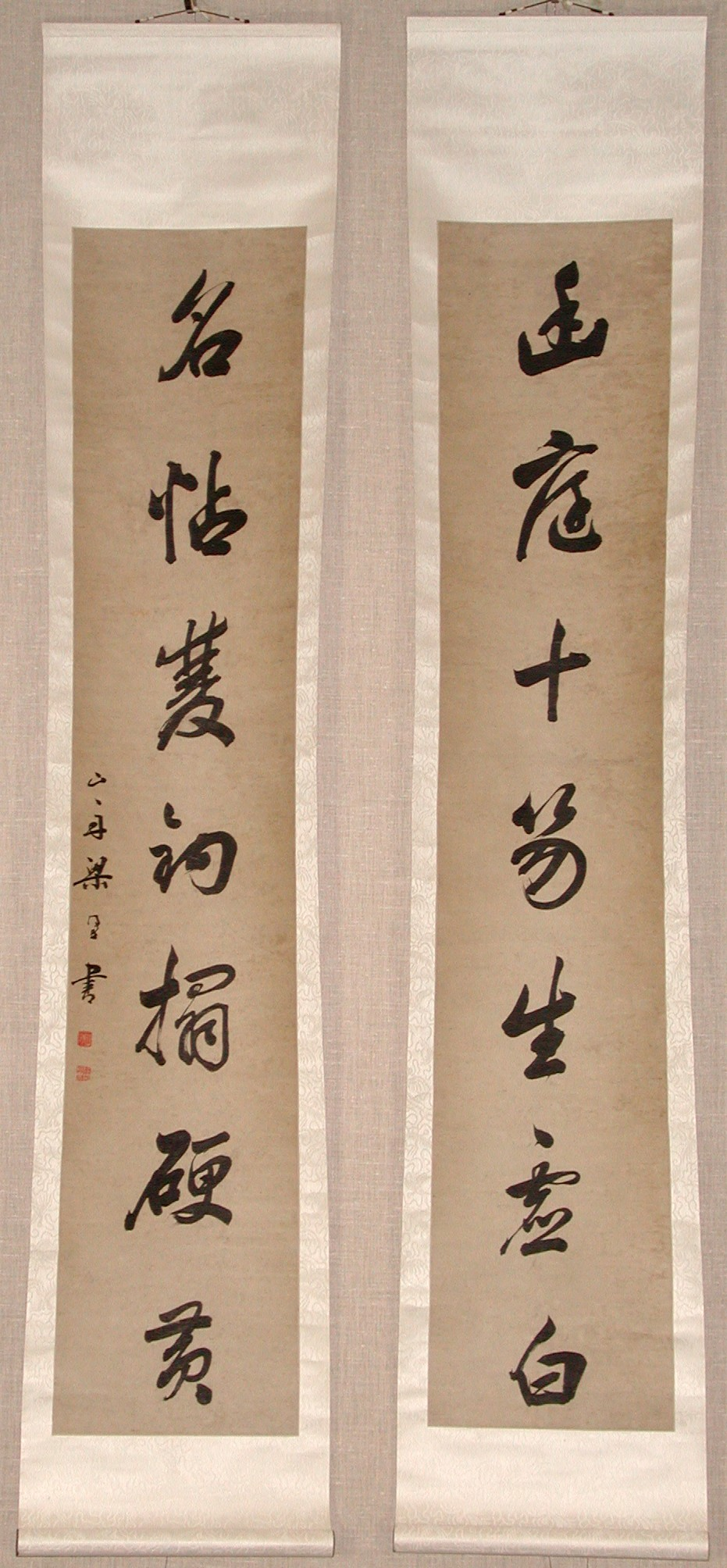
Duilian written in semi-cursive script

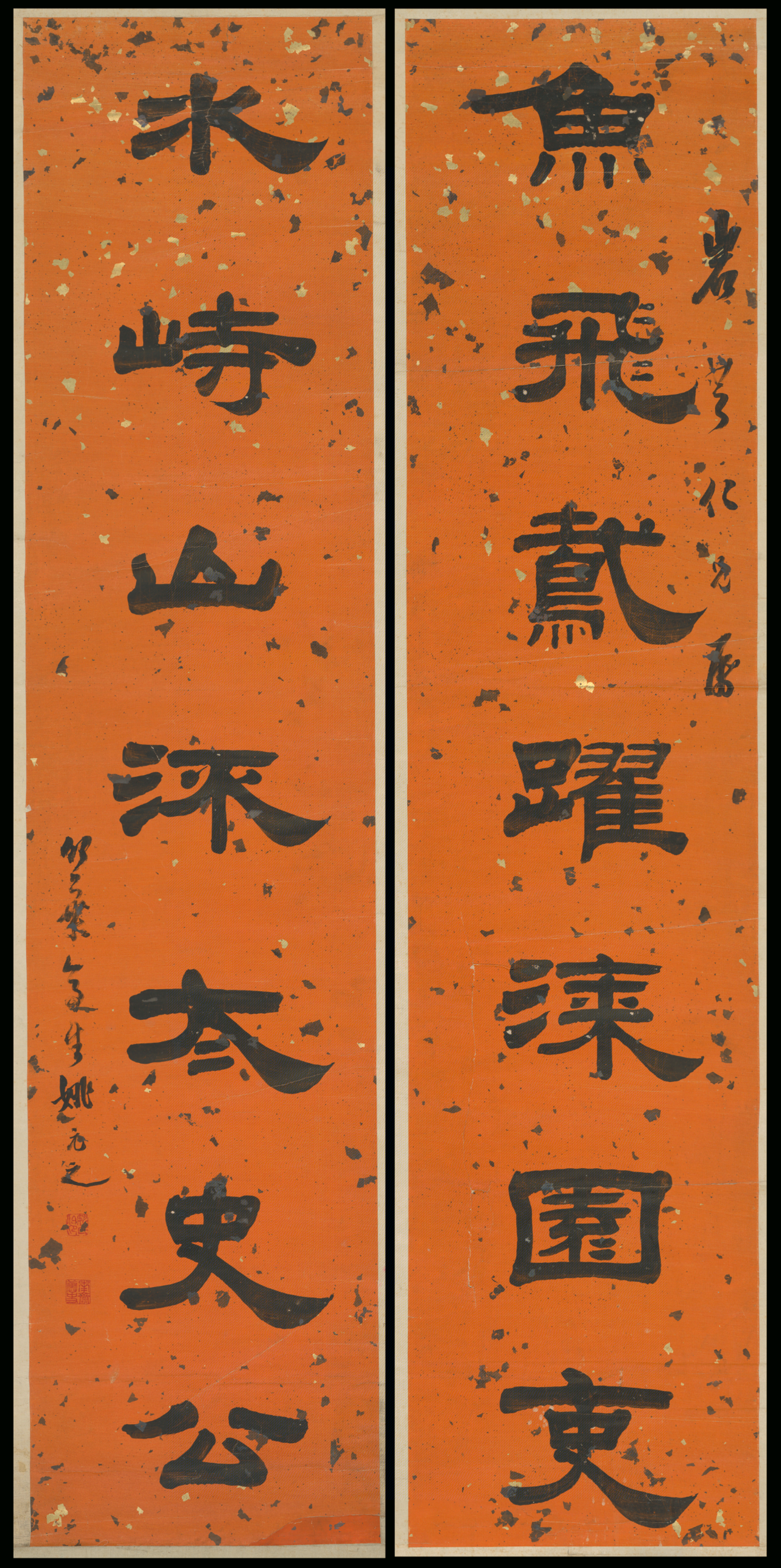
Duilian written in clerical script

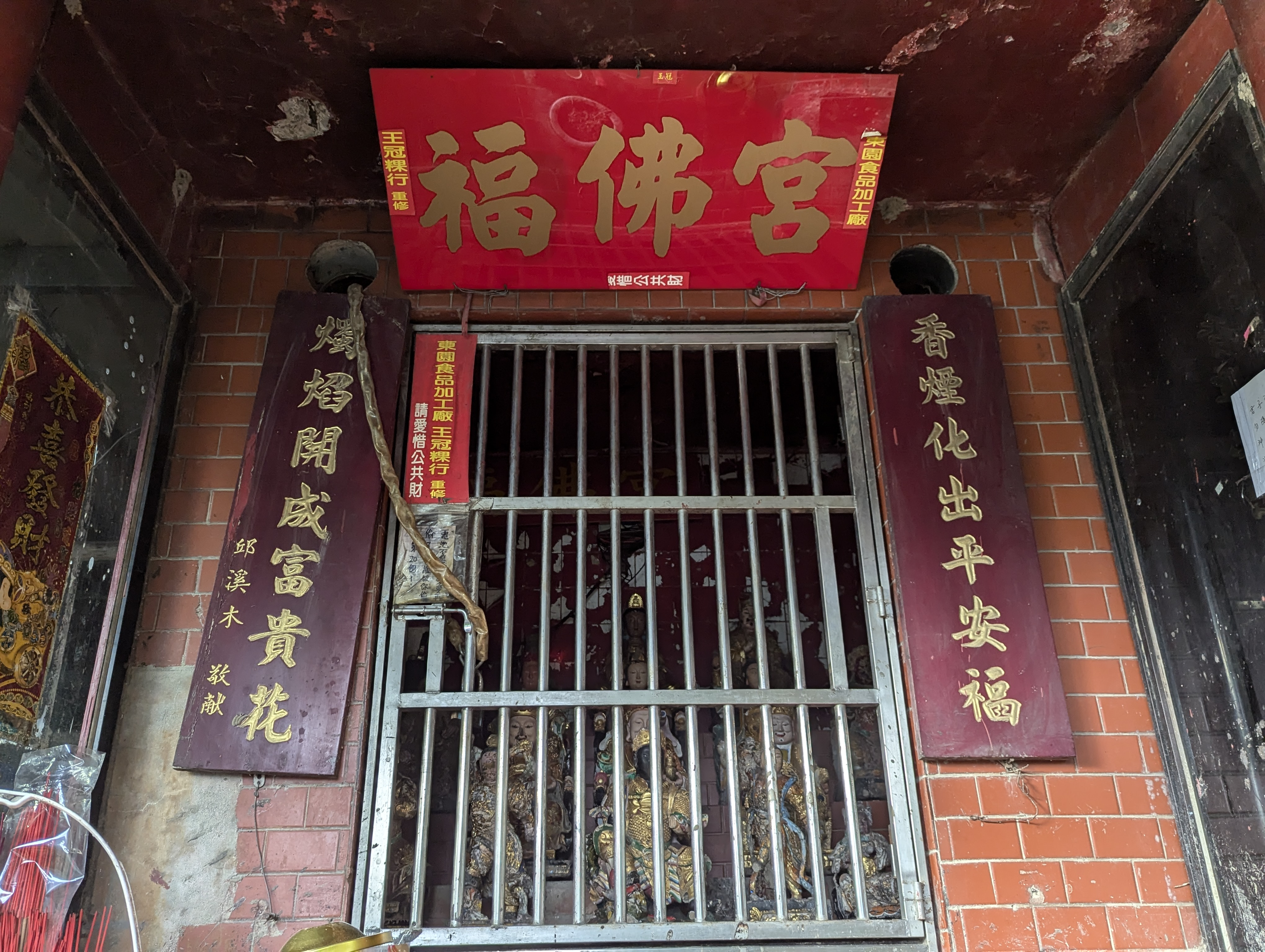

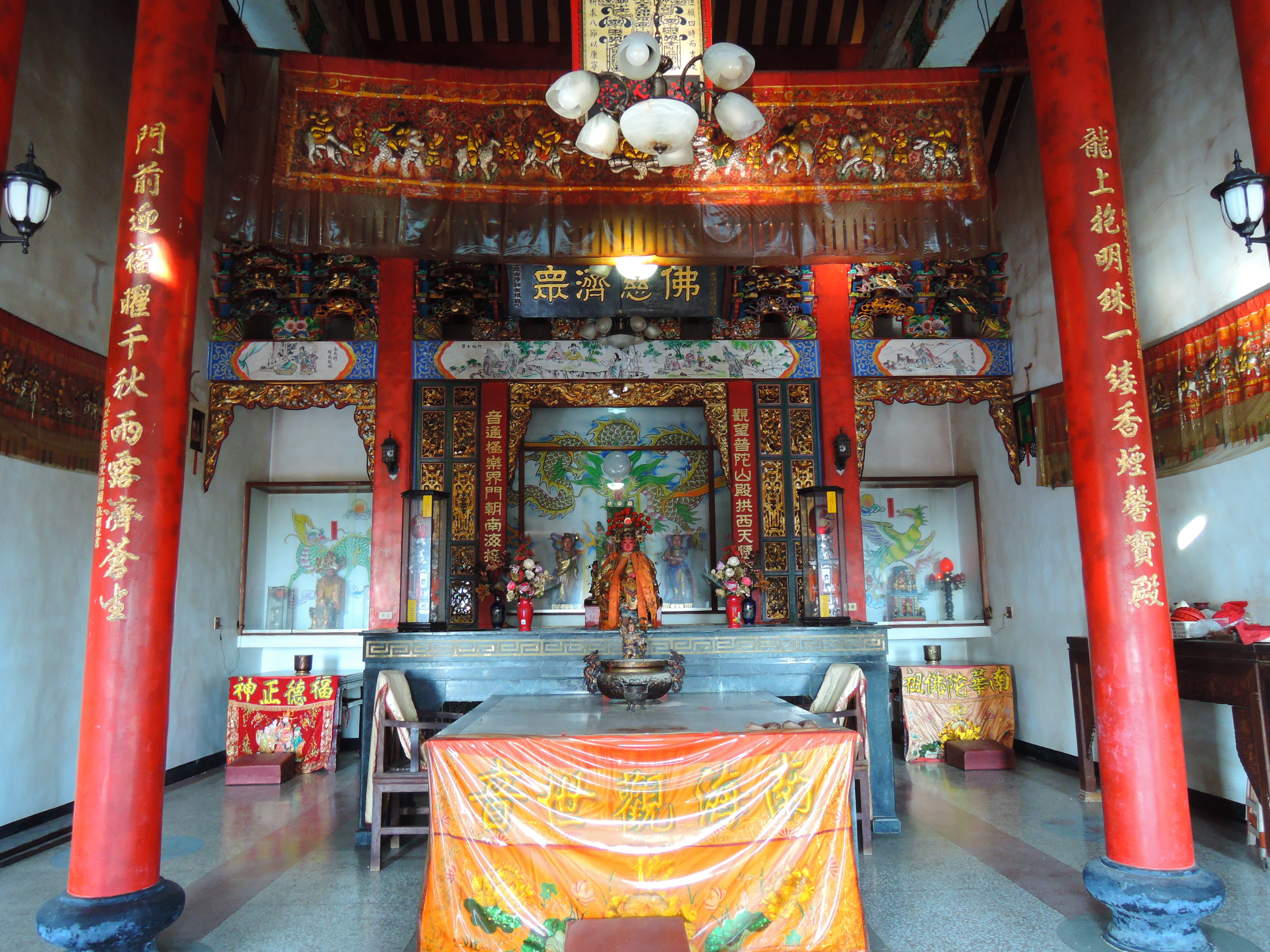
Pillar duilian reading the tribute of Avalokiteśvara

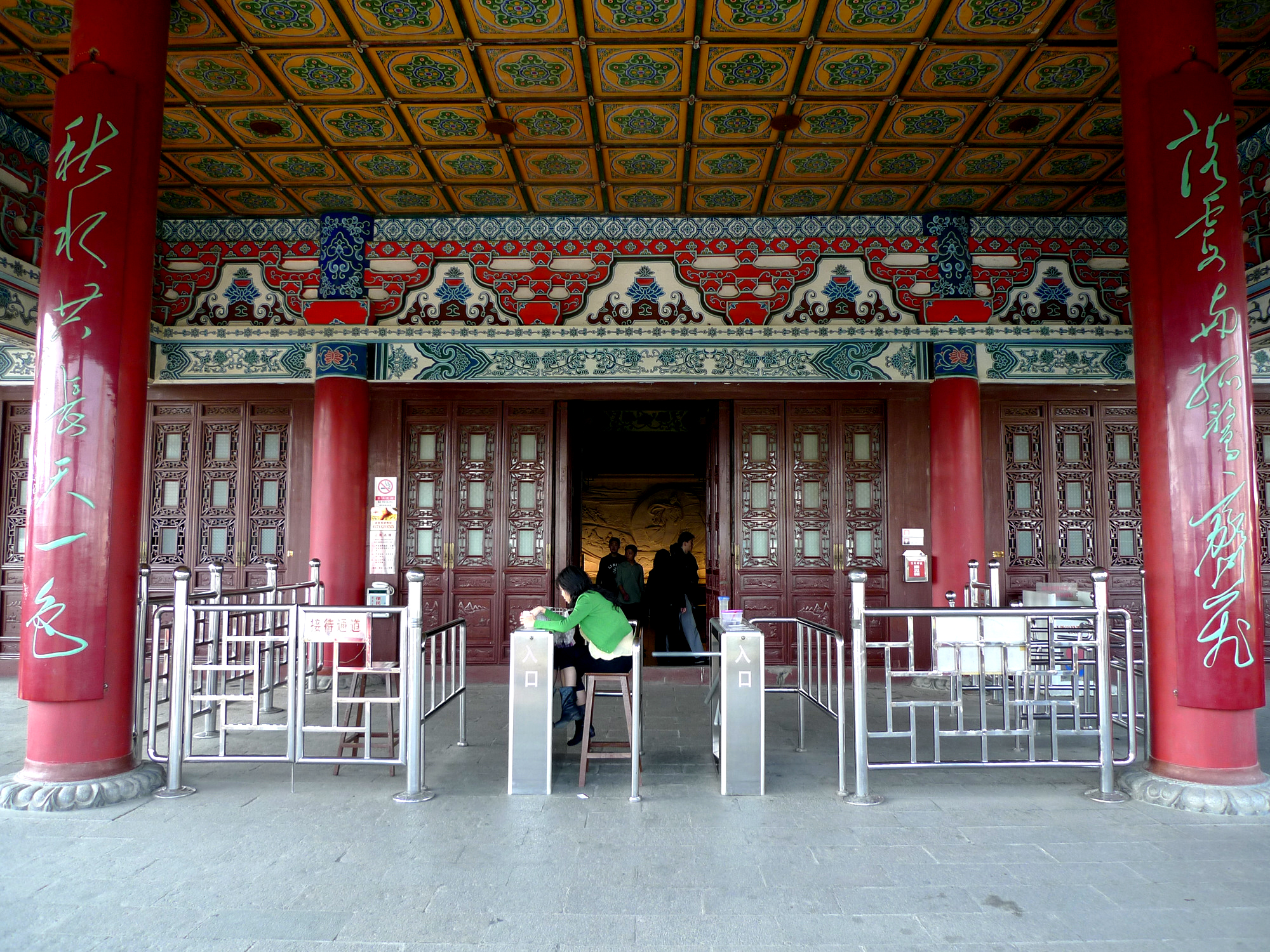
Pillar duilian in Pavilion of Prince Teng, written in cursive script by Mao Zedong, excerpted from Tengwang Ge Xu

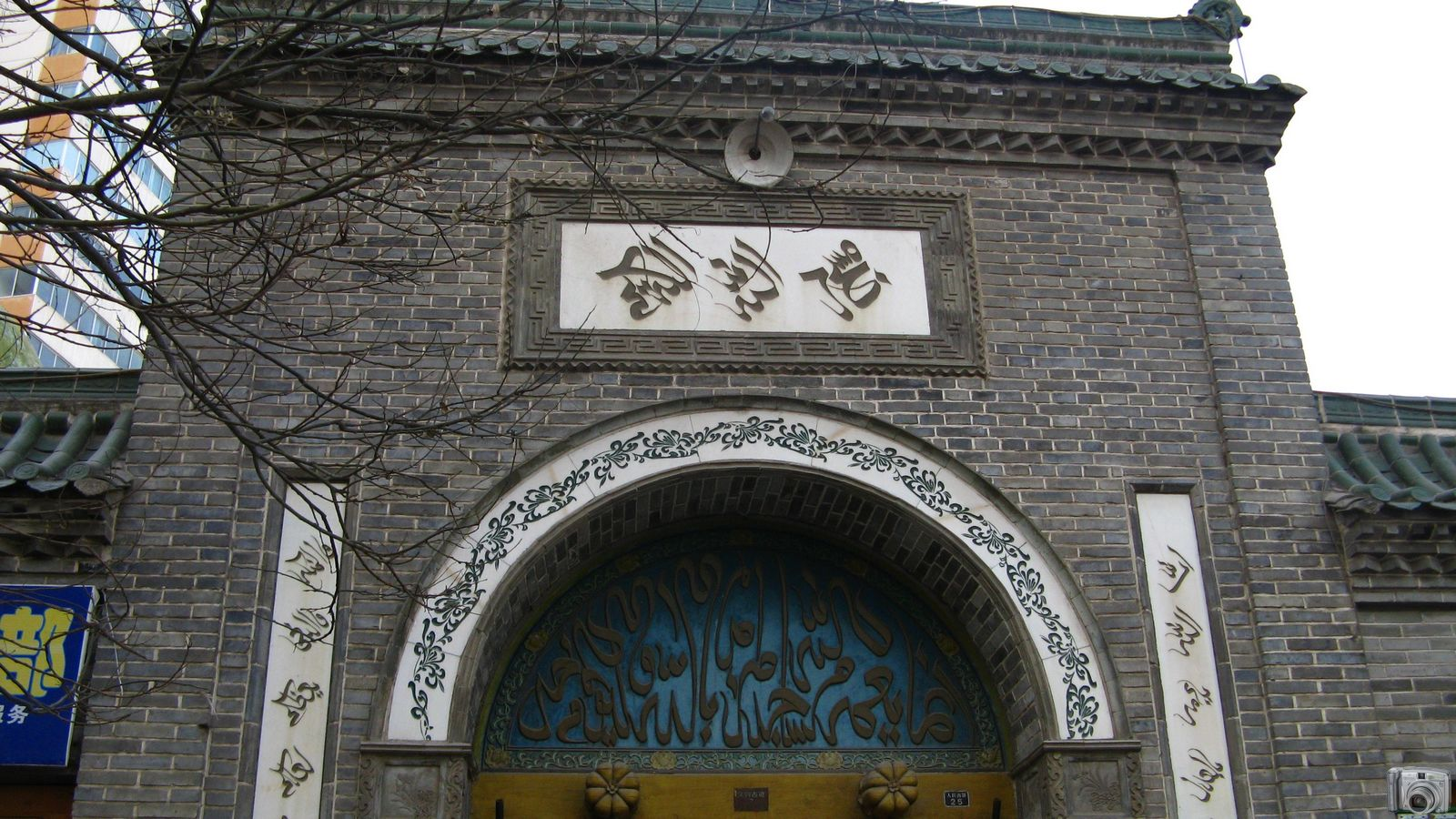
Arabic duilian outside Tianshui temple

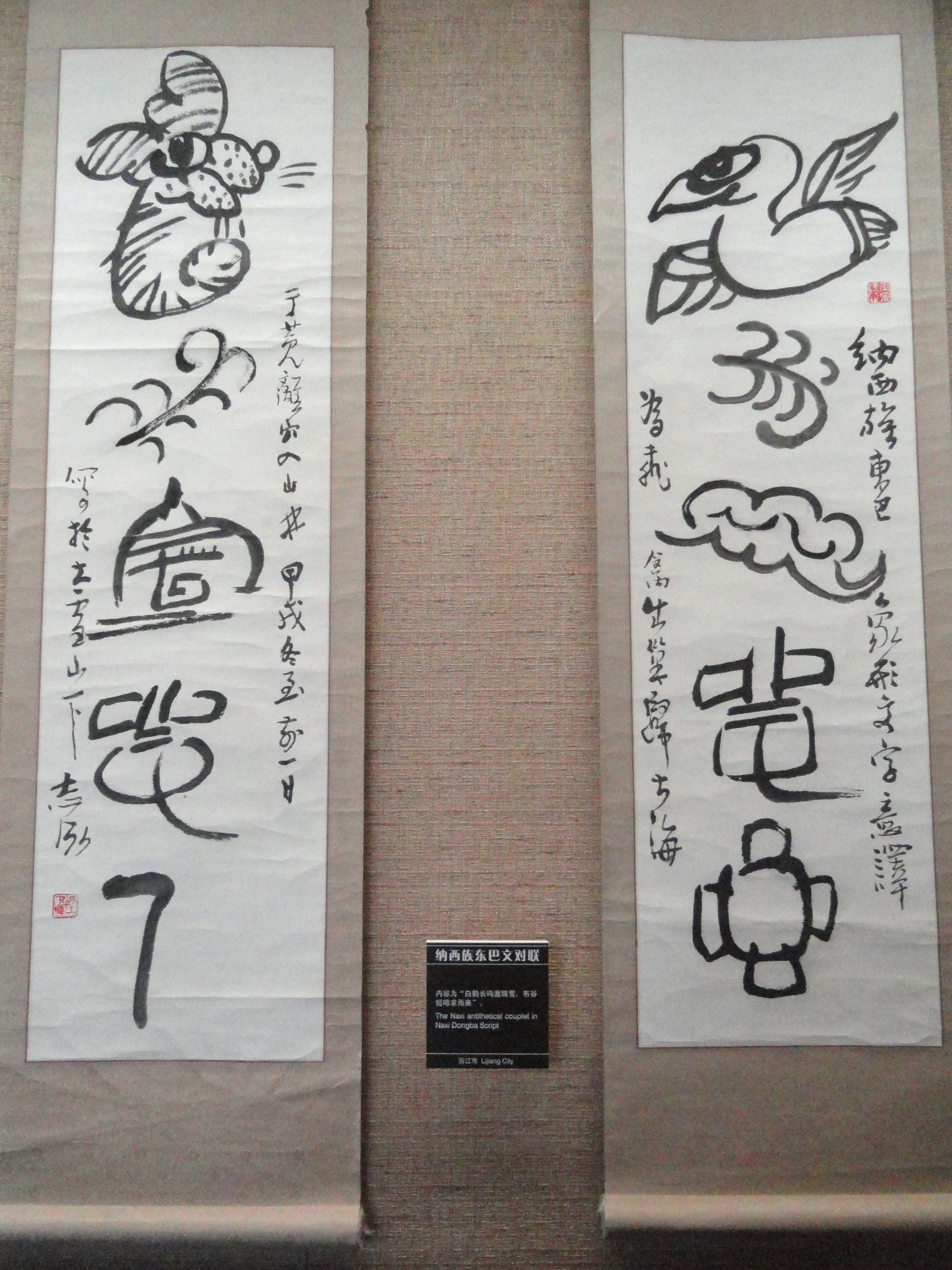
Manuscripts in the Yunnan Nationalities Museum, Nakhi weather lore in Dongba symbols
