= Fai chun =

Traditional decoration used during Chinese New Year

- Traditional Chinese: 揮春
- Simplified Chinese: 挥春
Transcriptions
Standard Mandarin
- Hanyu Pinyin: Huīchūn
Yue: Cantonese
- Jyutping: fai1 ceon1

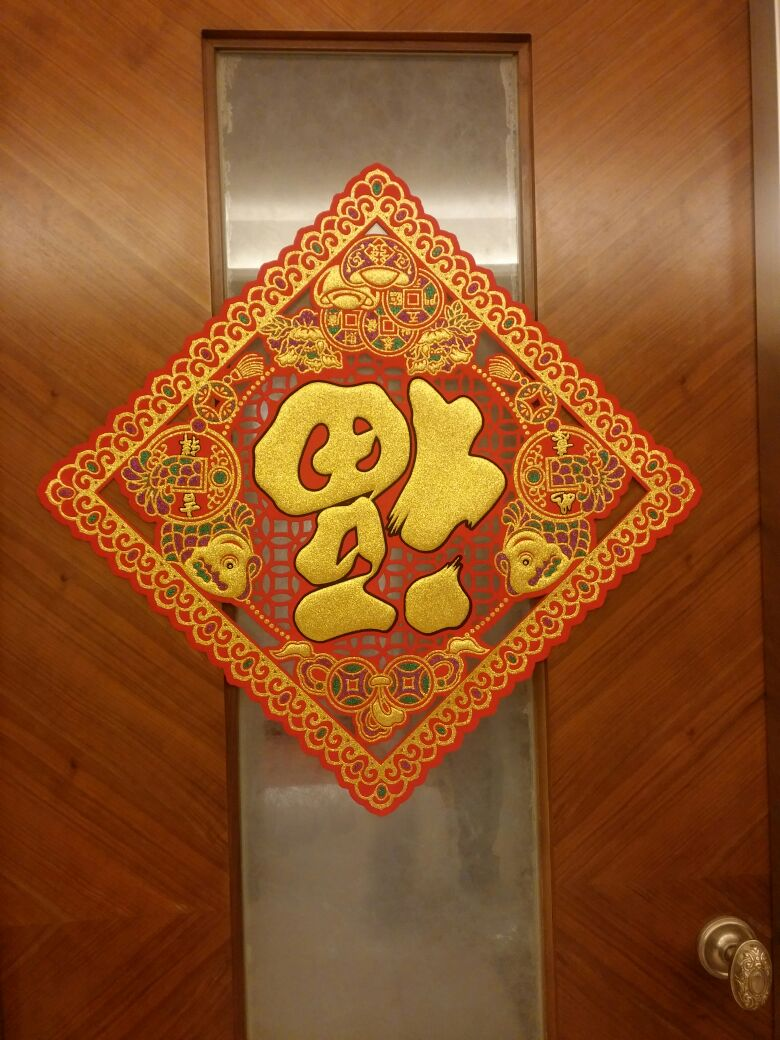
An inverted sparkling "fu" (福) doufang which is made of cloth is being hung on the door.

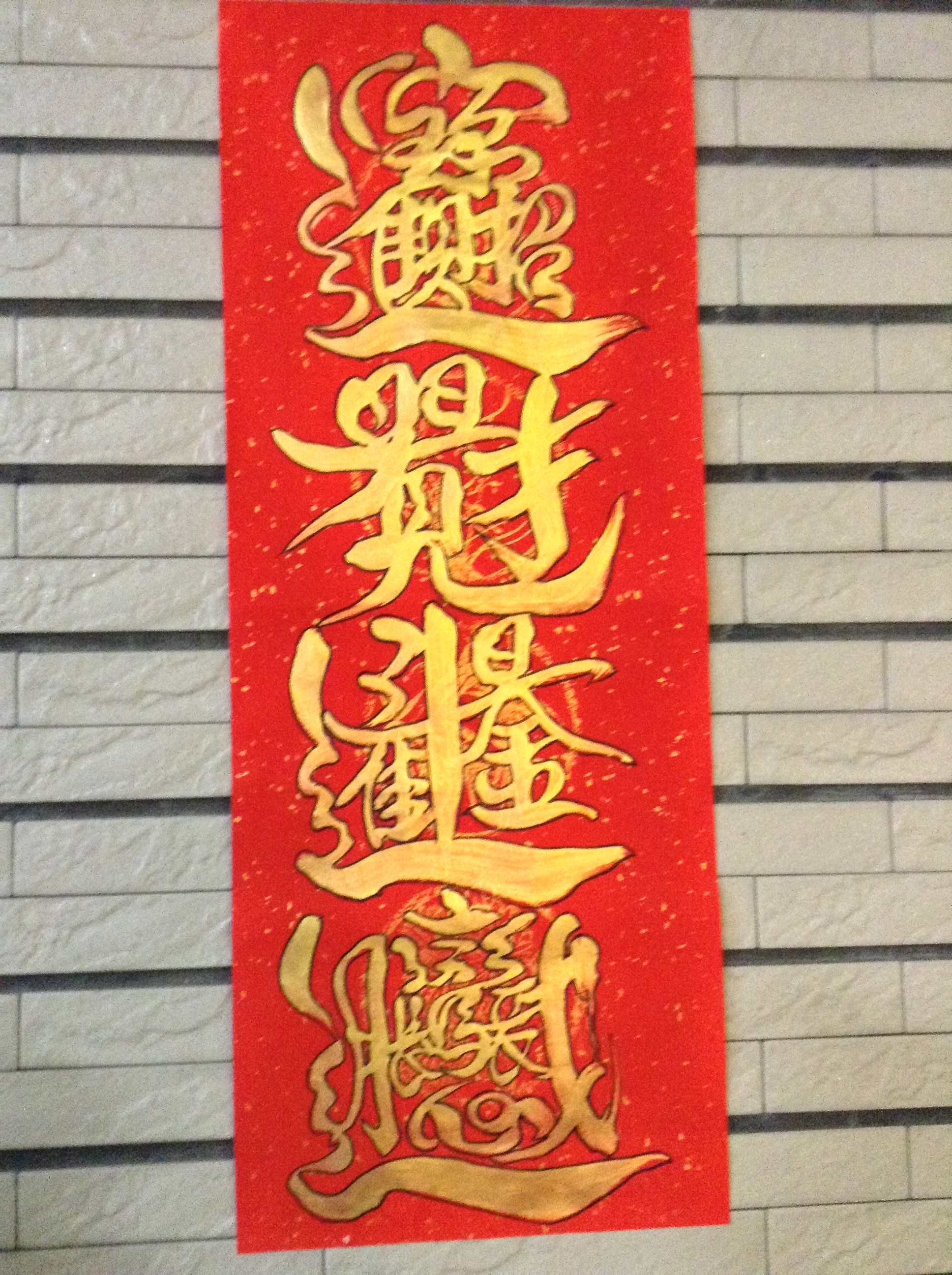
Examples of combined words

Fai chun (traditional Chinese: 揮春; simplified Chinese: 挥春; pinyin: huīchūn) or chunlian (春聯; 春联; chūnlián) is a traditional decoration that is frequently used during Chinese New Year. People put fai chun in doorways to create an optimistic festive atmosphere, since the phrases written on them refer to good luck and prosperity. They are customarily written by hand, but for convenience, printed versions are now mass-produced. They may be either square or rectangular in shape. They are popularly used not only in Greater China, but also in Korea, Japan, and Vietnam.

== History ==
Fai chun originated from taofu (桃符; peach wood charms) in ancient times. Peachwood charms are long pieces of wood hung from peach trees. They are about seven to eight inches long and slightly more than one inch wide. According to the legend, there was a peach tree in the East China Sea that was the gate where the ghosts passed through between the underworld and the world of the living. Two gods, Shentu and Yulei, were responsible for guarding this gate. The ghosts traveling the world at night time were required to return to the underworld before the early morning. It was believed that the two gods could dispel all the demons which did harm to human at night time. People, therefore, used the peach wood to make two puppets of the two gods and put them at the entrance of their home in order to protect their family. Then, as early as the Han dynasty, people found that it was hard and complicated to make puppets, so they simplified the puppets to two peach wood boards on which they drew portraits of the gods. Later on, people simply wrote down the names of the gods on pieces of peach wood and hung them on both sides of the door. Around the Tang dynasty, commoners no longer wrote the names of the gods only but add some blessings to symbolize good fortune as well as express their hope and best wishes in the new year. Since Ming dynasty, pieces of peach wood were replaced by square red papers.

There is another story which is related to Fai Chun history. According to the legend, there was a monster who lived in the deep sea and had a lion-like head and an ox-like body, who was named ''Nian'' (年). Around New Year, it scared the villagers by eating their crops, livestock and even the villagers themselves.

One time, during a rampage, Nian was seen running away from a house which had a red shirt hanging outside and then later, from a light. Consequently, the villagers discovered that the monster was afraid of red color, loud noise and flaming light. Since then, before every New Year, people paste red couplets in and outside their house, and let off firecrackers and fireworks, in order to scare the monster away.

After Nian went back to the sea, people would come out and celebrate the New Year. This became a tradition every year, with people keep pasting red couplets every year, which is called Fai Chun now.

== Color ==
Traditional fai chun is in bright red color with black or gold characters inscribed on it with a brush. Similar to the color of fire, red color was chosen to scare the legendary fierce and barbarous beast “Nian”, which ate up villagers’ crops, livestock and even villagers themselves on the eve of the new year.

== Forms of fai chun ==
In the past, fai chun was presented in Xuan paper. Its fine and soft texture enables vivid and dynamic artistic expression of Chinese calligraphy. In this age of technology, city dwellers seldom write their own fai chun. Instead, they purchase them in stationery stores or shopping malls where a wide diversity of styles is offered.

Thanks to advances in technology, fai chun can be printed in multiple colors. Commercialization of fai chun can be seen when animated characters are used to attract children while sparkling decorations are used to attract adults. Moreover, the material of fai chun is no more limited to mere paper. Fai chun made by cloth, plastic and layers of cardboard are quite common. Nevertheless, the practice of writing fai chun continues in traditional areas, particularly in walled villages.

In Chinese Christian communities, fai chun often carry quotations from the Gospels.

== Types of fai chun ==
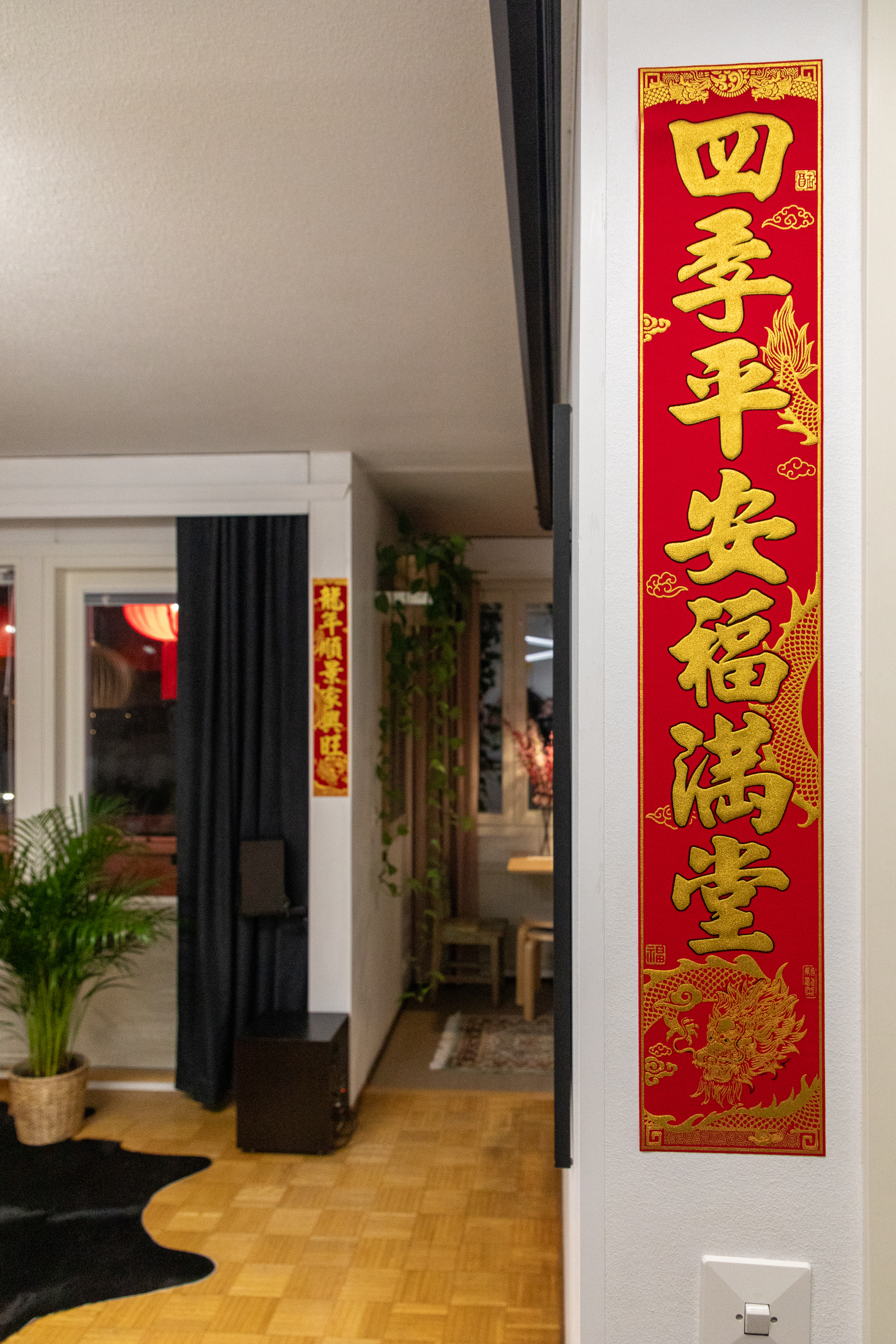
Chunlian in an apartment. Normally the installation is at the both sides (and top) of one (normally main) door. Here depth impression is used as a stylistic choice.

The types of fai chun are as follows:

=== Doufang ===
A doufang (斗方) is a single character written on a square oriented so that its angles point to the four cardinal points. Owing to the limited space, this type of fai chun only displays one character, such as chun (春; spring), man (滿; full, abundant), shou (壽； longevity), or fu (福; good fortune). 滿 man is stuck on rice bins or refrigerators as a wish for abundant food. 福 Fu is always purposely posted inverted, and is usually hung on the center of the front door of the house. In Mandarin, the words “inverted” (倒, dao) and “arrival” (到, dao) are homonyms, so fu dao can mean either "upside-down character fu" or “good fortune arrives“. Another type of character often used for doufang is the combined character, or lianzi (連字) - these are not real words used in spoken or written Chinese, but are a number of lucky characters written together to look like a single character.

=== Chuntiao ===
Chuntiao (春條) is a vertical or horizontal rectangle that carries two or four Chinese characters. Auspicious phases are expressed based on various contexts. For example, “Gōngxǐ fācái” 恭喜發財 is an ubiquitous phrase that wishes people to become affluent so it can be seen in all occasions. Regarding workplace, “Cáiyuán gǔngǔn” (財源滾滾; Merchandise will turn like a wheel) is a term that suggest prosperity. At home, “niánnián yǒuyú” (年年有餘; Surplus year-after-year) are deemed to wish for excess family possessions in the end of the year. Children usually paste “Xuéyè jìnbù” (學業進步; Progress in studies) on their bedroom doors hoping for higher form position in the coming academic year while the elderly hang “Lóng mǎ jīngshén” (龍馬精神; Spirits of dragon and horse), which is conceived to be able to shelter them from diseases.

=== Chunlian (Spring couplets) ===
Chunlian (春聯) is a couplet or duilian, of typically seven characters per line. The two lines of poetry are hung on either side of the door frame. The content of chunlian is related to the Chinese New Year and the lexical and tonal rules of classical Chinese poetry are followed, though not strictly. Sometimes, concurrently with the chunlian, a horizontal scroll with four to five characters is hung on the crosspiece of the door. Its content expresses the wishes of the homeowner for the upcoming year. Besides being hung on door frames, chunlian are also used on the banners that are unfurled at the end of a dragon dance.
