= Jiji ru lüling =

Taoist spell

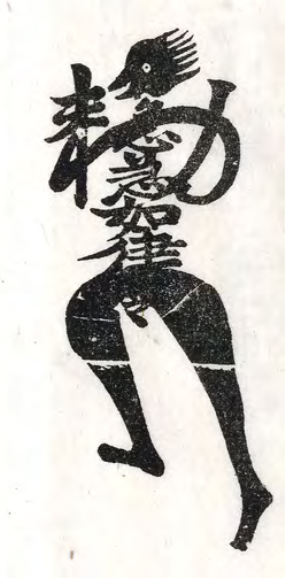
Talismanic drawing of the thunder deity Deng Bowen which contains the characters jiji ru lüling inside his body, from Daofa Huiyuan, Ming dynasty

Jiji ru lüling (Chinese: 急急如律令; pinyin: jíjí rúlǜlìng) is a Taoist spell used to ward off evil spirits. Taken from Han official documents, it became a set Taoist idiom in both verbal and written forms. Almost every Taoist charm and ritual concludes with the statement to show that the invoked spirit entity must follow the orders of the incantation without delay. The literal meaning in English is "promptly, promptly, in accordance with the statutes and ordinances". English sinologist Arthur Waley suggests that "no one knows" if lüling was a spirit or whether it means "the Law". Localization attempts have rendered it as "obey orders presto" or "swift and uplift".

The incantation is sometimes recited as jiji ru [names of deities] lüling, for instance, jiji ru Shangdi lüling. Characters such as she (攝, 'summon'), chi (敕, 'decree') and ji (疾, 'swiftly') are often added after the phrase.

== Origin ==
Pronouncing
Female Mandarin Chinese pronunciation

The incantation was originally a phrase appended to official documents during the Han dynasty, meaning "let this order be carried out immediately". It is related to other standard phrases that appear at the end of official Han dynasty documents, such as ru lüling (如律令, 'in accordance with the statutes and ordinances') and ru zhaoshu (如詔書, 'in accordance with the imperial decree'). Following Emperor Wu of Han's adoption of Dong Zhongshu's proposal to establish Confucianism as the theoretical foundation of the imperial state, the expression became increasingly rare in official state documents. Eventually, It was adopted by the priests of folk magic, whose magical writs usually ended with the fixed expression ru lüling. One simple pattern used as a magical write was "dispel all of the spells in accordance with the statutes and ordinances".

Towards the Eastern Han, more and more tombs were built purely of stone, with charms inscribed and "warding-off evil" pictures painted or carved inside. Some pictorial slabs have been discovered inscribed with the phrase jiji ru lüling. The expression is also found in Han dynasty tomb texts, first appearing on an ordinance jar dated to 92 ce and in a tomb contract of 161 ce. These funerary texts, directed to otherworldly officials, acted both as passports introducing the dead to the post-mortem bureaucracy and as commands ordering the dead to stay away from and not harm the living. One of these documents reads:

The subject deceased on the yisi 乙巳 day [the forty-second of the sexagesimal cycle] has the demon name "Heavenly Brightness". The Divine Master of the Heavenly Thearch has already been informed as to your name. Promptly remove yourself three thousand leagues away! Should you not go away, then the [lacuna] of Southern Mountain will be ordered to come and devour you. Promptly, in accordance with the statutes and ordinances!

Zhang Daoling introduced the term into Taoism. Han dynasty Taoist slips generally bore the phrase ru lüling, and only one instance contains jiji ru lüling, which has sparked controversy in academia. Starting from the Northern and Southern dynasties, the phrase jiji ru lüling appeared more frequently in Taoist scriptures, and its forms also became more varied, for example, ji ru lüling at the end of the burial clothing lists unearthed in the Turfan region.

There are other theories that Lü Ling is a name of a spirit in the Taoist pantheon, who attends the Thunder god and is very swift of foot, and jiji ru lüling means "go and do it quickly, as quickly as Lü Ling does it".

== Meaning and effects ==
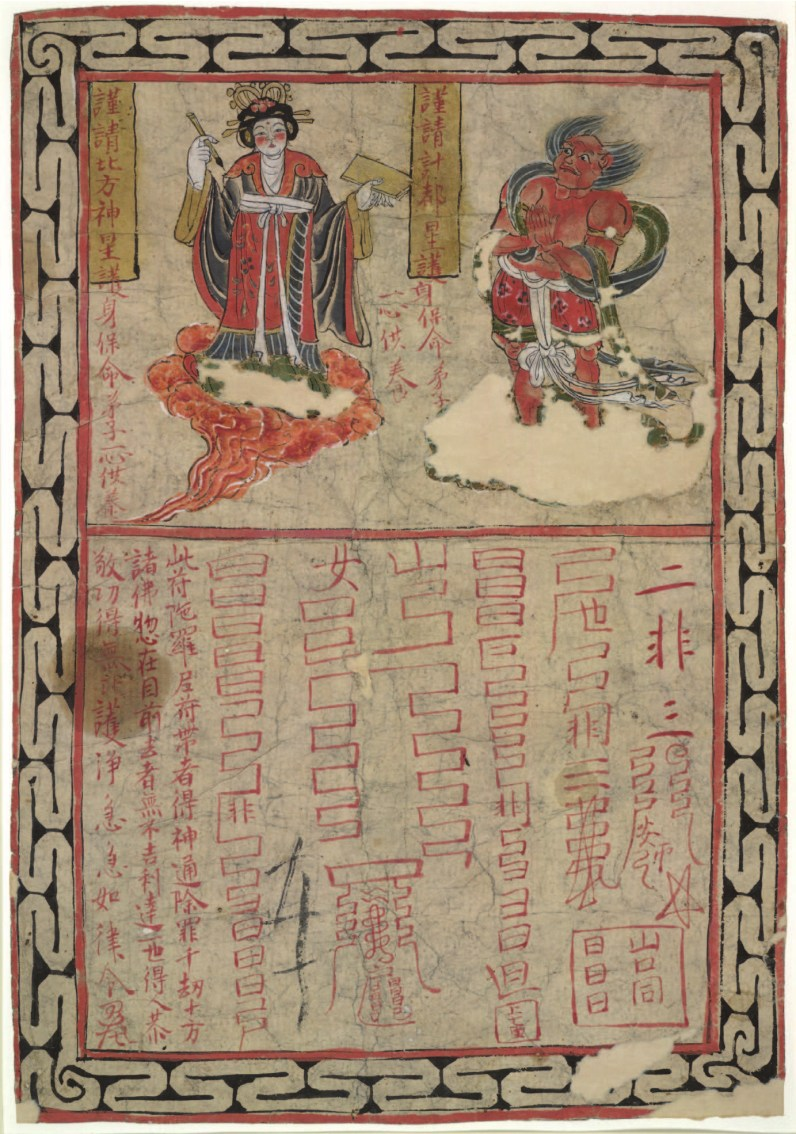
Painting from Dunhuang whose caption ends with jiji ru lüling, Five Dynasties

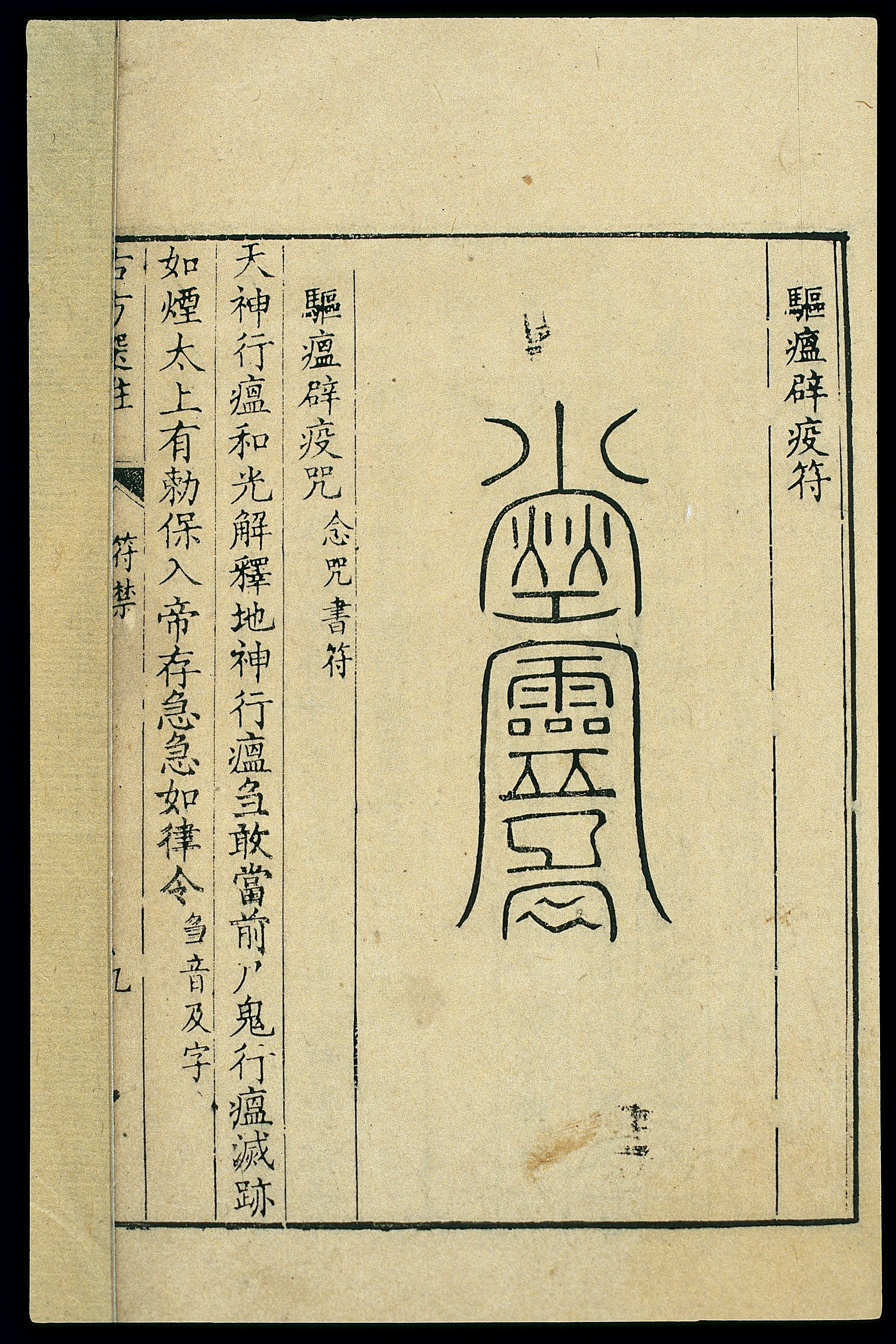
Jiji ru lüling appears in a spell to avert epidemic diseases, Qing dynasty

In the Taoist theological system, ritual masters usually directly address each of the spirits by their names to show that the ritual masters have the ability to control the spirits. The phrase jiji ru lüling in incantations is used in order to stress that these orders must be executed immediately; otherwise, the spirits will be punished. The term has been identified as a bureaucratic feature of Taoist ritual from early on, where the practitioner seeks the aid of higher powers to make incantation effective. Once sanctioned by this authority, the practitioner acquires immense power that "is commensurate with that of Heaven and Earth". Enveloped by this power, demons "have nowhere to hide", and the cure is guaranteed.

Usage of the spell-command has spread into the rituals of Esoteric Buddhism, being written as ji zhou ru lü ling (急咒如律令, 'quickly let the spell [be effective] in accordance with the command of the law'). After being transmitted to Japan, the inscription has also been adapted into Shugendō and Onmyōdō, as well as being sometimes written in kanji as 喼急如律令. Ji chi lüling (急勑律令) is also considered a common variant of the phrase, meaning "quickly, according to issued statutes and orders".

Since this phrase is regarded as a synecdoche for Taoist ritual, the daughter of Taishang Laojun was named Jiji. A well-established Taoist convention, the idiom is also cited in literary works, exemplified by Ji Long Wen (祭龍文, To Beseech the Dragon King) composed by Tang dynasty poet Bai Juyi to beseech for rainfall:

若三日之內，一雨滂沱，是龍之靈，亦人之幸，禮無不報。神其聽之，急急如律令。
If there is heavy rain within three days, it will be the Dragon King’s blessing on human beings. We mortals will offer ritual sacrifice, Lord Dragon! We beseech you to consider this request! Urgent as law.

In modern times, the spell is commonly used in Chinese movies and TV shows. The frequent depiction of onmyōji in many works of fiction has likewise led to the recurring presence of the incantation within Japanese popular culture.

== See also ==
- Fulu
- Taoist coin charm
- Lei Ting curse charm
- Chinese spiritual world concepts
- Chinese gods and immortals
- Ghosts in Chinese culture
- Abracadabra
