= Fulu =

Taoist magic symbols and incantations

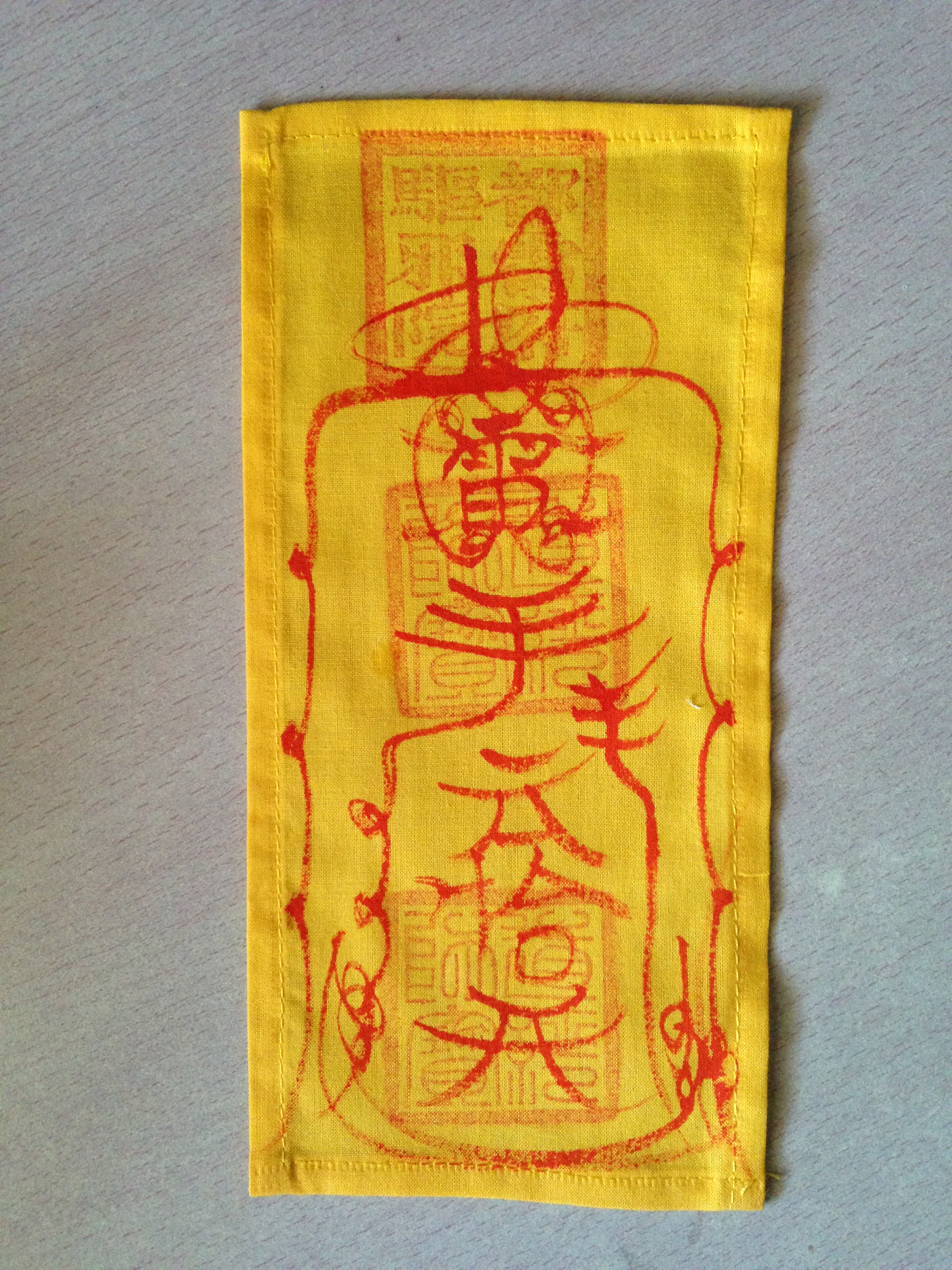
Fulu for placement above the primary entrance of one's home, intended to protect against evil

Fulu (traditional Chinese: 符籙; simplified Chinese: 符箓; pinyin: fúlù) are asemic Taoist magic symbols and incantations, translatable into English as 'talismanic script', (Note: This article primarily refers to the markings as either fulu, or as 'talismanic script'. Other possible English terms for fulu include 'magic writing', 'magic script', 'magic figures', 'magic formulae', 'secret talismanic writing', and 'talismanic characters',) which are written or painted on talismans by Taoist practitioners.

These practitioners are called fulu pai (符籙派; fúlù pài; 'the fulu sect'), an informal group made up of priests from different schools of Taoism. Like most aspects of Taoist practice, use of these objects is not confined to Taoism: they have been incorporated into several forms of Chinese Buddhism, and have inspired the ofuda used in Japanese Buddhism and Shinto and the bujeok used in Korean shamanism.

== Etymology ==
Fu (符; fú) are instructions for deities and spirits, symbols for exorcism, and recipes for potions or charms used to treat ailments. A lu (籙; lù) is a registry for the memberships of priests, which additionally lists the skills they are trained in.

== History ==
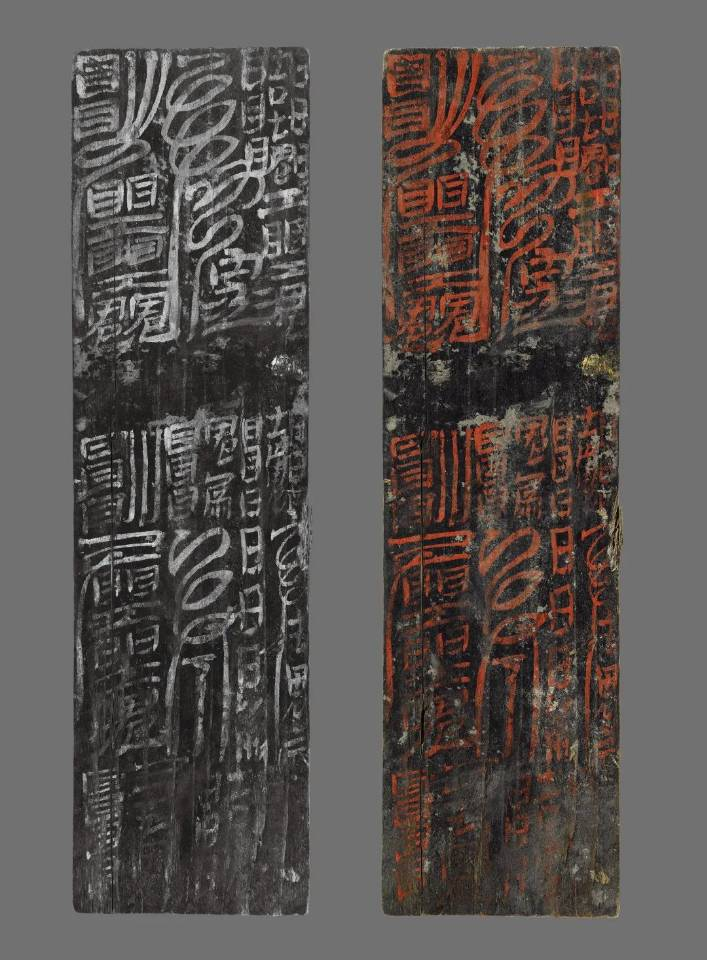
Han dynasty Chinese talisman, part of the Wucheng Bamboo-slips

Scholarly research into the history of Taoist symbolism has always been a particular challenge, because historically, Taoist priests have often used abstruse, obscure imagery writing to express their thoughts, meaning that a path to their successful decipherment and interpretation isn't always readily found in primary sources. According to scholar Yang Zhaohua, while a number of the earliest known Taoist talismans were "simple and legible", later examples had become deliberately cryptic in order to signal their divinity. Other scholars of Taoism such as James Robson and Gil Raz have claimed that the incomprehensibility of written forms is central to the talisman's perceived authority and efficacy, and is one of talismanic script's defining features.

During the Eastern Jin dynasty (317–420), it was already considered unnecessary for users of Taoist talismans to be able to decipher the writing on them in order for them to be considered efficacious. Ge Hong noted in his Baopuzi that as long as the inscription was authentic, successful use of the talisman did not depend on whether the user was able to decipher its script. By this time, the talismans' illegibility had already become a sign that they were of divine authority and held supernatural provenance.

== Design ==
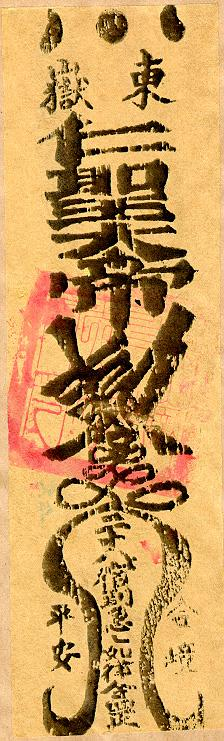
A fulu talisman

Fulu tend to have irregular strokes that resemble Chinese characters, often elongating existing words while incorporating non-character symbols. Taoist priests are the main interpreters of this eclectic writing system, and the characters can differ from sect to sect. The method of writing down these characters is generally passed down in secret from a Taoist priest to their disciples and treated as a special craft with which to communicate to local deities and spirits. According to Fudan University professor Ge Zhaoguang, the unreadability of Taoist talismanic is a type of 'linguistic archaism' deliberately designed to be incomprehensible, as "a veil of unfathomable otherwordliness" that allows only a small number of qualified clergy to adequately produce them.

Some fulu appear to have been created from a composition of two Chinese characters, by stacking one atop of the other. This technique of synthesis was not unique to Taoists: fulu also appear on other kinds of Chinese charms, such as Buddhist coin charms and woodblock prints. Fulu style varies from sect to sect, with each having different incantations and different mudras used in their creation. Even the invocations used for a single deity will vary between sects.

== Healthcare ==
Fulu and other talismanic techniques have been used for millennia in China as a healing method alongside medicines, meditation, acupuncture, astrology, and massage. At least as far back as the Eastern Han dynasty when the Taoist Way of the Taiping was founded, the practice was used to heal patients. Known as zhuyou (祝由; zhùyóu) in medical writings, the use of talismans enjoyed official support between the Sui and the late Ming dynasties, though seeing decline when rival acupuncture practices were recognised by the imperial court as a medicinal discipline in the 6th century.

While rejected by traditional Chinese medicine, zhuyou continues to be widely used amongst Chinese folk healers today. With the growing influence of Western psychology in the 20th century, zhuyou began to be interpreted as a Chinese counterpart of Western hypnosis.

== Literary references ==
One of the earliest references to fulu is found in the Huangdi Yinfujing, though without adequate instructions for the writing thereof. The second chapter of each of the three grottoes in the Daozang is a record of the history and feats of the 'fulu sect', where fulu are said to originate with the condensation of clouds in the sky.

== Coins ==
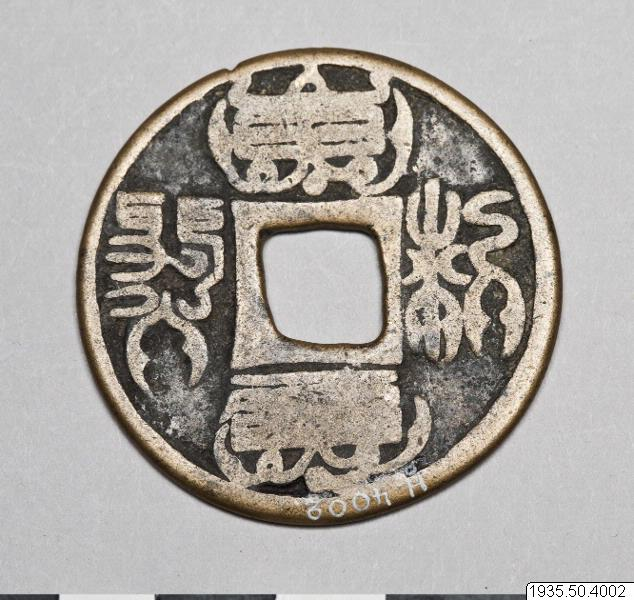
A charm with fulu at the Museum of Ethnography in Sweden

Fulu was also incorporated into coin talismans, of which many resemble cash. Many of these talismans have not yet been deciphered. One specimen has been described where talismanic script was written side by side with Chinese characters suspected to be their glosses or equivalents. On rare occasions, fulu has also been found on Buddhist numismatic charms and amulets. Most of these coin talismans request Lei Gong to protect its carriers from evil spirits and misfortune.

Fulu are usually included at the beginning and the end of the inscription on a Taoist coin charm.

== See also ==
- Jiji ru lüling
- Bujeok
- Chinese ritual mastery traditions
- Chinese folk religion
- Chinese spiritual world concepts
- Bird-worm seal script
- Daoshi
- Fuji (planchette writing)
- Ofuda and omamori
- Shigandang
- Thai Buddha amulet
- True form (Taoism)
- Talisman
