= True form (Taoism) =

Metaphysical theory in Taoism

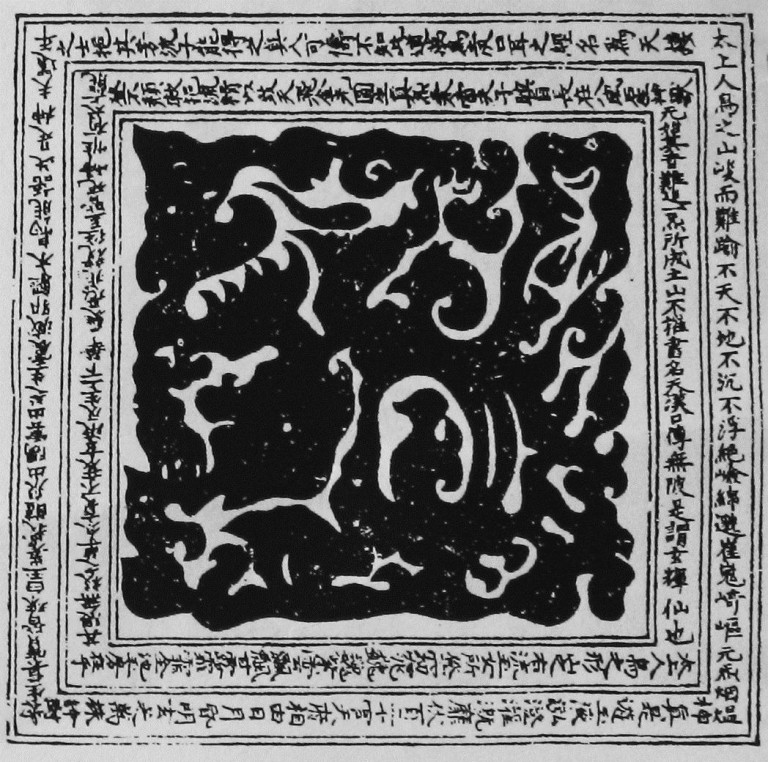
- The Chart of True Form of the Topography of the Most High Man-Bird Mountain (太上人鳥山真形圖).

Chinese name
- Traditional Chinese: 真形 / 眞形
- Simplified Chinese: 真形 / 眞形
Transcriptions
Standard Mandarin
- Hanyu Pinyin: zhēn xíng

Vietnamese name
- Vietnamese alphabet: Chân hình
- Chữ Hán: 真形 / 眞形

In Taoism, the concept of a true form (Chinese: 真形 / 眞形; pinyin: Zhēn xíng) is a metaphysical theory which posits that there are immutable essences of things — that is, images of the eternal Dao without form. This belief exists in Chinese Daoist traditions such as the Three Sovereigns corpus, where they emphasise the capacity of talismans, charts, and diagrams to depict both "true forms" and "true names" (真名; Zhēn míng) of demons and spirits. These talismanic representations are considered to be windows into the metaphysical substance of the entities whose "true form" and "true name" they depict. Since both the "true form" and the "true name" of an entity are two sides of the same coin, diagrams and talismans, could serve as apotropaic amulets or summoning devices for the deities the Taoists believed populated the cosmic mountains.

Taoists created charts (albums) depicting these "true forms" to help guide them safely through holy places during their pilgrimages, later they created talismans (charms) which displayed these true form charts. A talisman was more easily carried on the person and provided protection for seekers of the Dao as they journeyed into these mountainous areas.

== Concept ==
During the medieval period (中世紀) Taoists developed the idea of the "true form" or zhenxing. The term "true form" denotes the original form something has as a part of the "Dao" (道; dào), which Taoists refer to as the "Great Image without form" (大象無形), and can be applied to a broad range of things such as a deity, an icon, a purified self, a talisman, or a picture. Essentially, talismans and diagrams were depictions of a supramundane entities, and gave a visually observable shape to the metaphysical substance of a supramundane being's "image", which they referred to as the xiang (象). Taoists believe that the "true form" or name of a spirit inscribed on a talisman is legible only to supernatural beings, and being in possession of such a talisman gives a sort of temporary "control" over the entity whose name or form is possessed. The names of the entities were typically written in celestial script (天文), a type of divine talismanic writing, pm a support medium per the instructions provided to the talisman maker in conventional Chinese characters. Once the talisman was reproduced it had to be activated through rituals allowing them to control the associated entities.

Taoists view the "true form" as the inner, often invisible, and formless quality of an entity which they contrast with the outer, visible, and concrete form of the entity. As a key concept behind Taoist visuality, "true forms" are not static and to gain the ability to see these underlying and secret phenomena entails an active journey. Taoist practitioners claim that being able to see "true forms" requires the person to rigorously meditate and visualize and receive spiritual revelation, which requires both practice and have a lot of religious discipline.

"True forms" serve as the parent concept for related Taoist notions such as "true names" (真名), "true concealed names" (真諱), "true talismans" (真符), "true characters" (真字), and "true texts" (真本).

According to Dutch Sinologist Kristofer Schipper the concept of "true forms" is the central unifying concept uniting both Taoist art and rituals.

Other than Taoists, Chinese Buddhists have also adopted "true forms", and the related concept of "true faces" (真容), into their practice.

== True form charts ==
The "True Forms Chart of the Five Sacred Peaks" (五嶽真形圖; Wǔyuè zhēn xíng tú) illustrated in the Imperial Encyclopedia, section "Mountains and Rivers". (Note: In the Imperial Encyclopedia the chart is referred to as the "五嶽眞形圖" rather than the "五嶽真形圖".)

In order to visualize "true forms" medieval Taoists developed what they called "true form charts" (真形圖; zhēn xíng tú). (Note: These are alternatively known as true form diagrams or true form albums in English.) These true form charts are typically aniconic diagrams organized in a puzzling configuration depicting mountain-inspired paradises (such as grotto-heavens), sacred sites, and Diyu (hells). They are classified by Guo Ruoxu (郭若虛) as "magical paintings" (術畫) and in the Daozang they are classified as "Numinous Charts". Taoists believe that true form charts and talismans have the power to uncover the "true forms" of the spirits, demons, and numinous entities that inhabit the world, as well as places such as mountains. Taoists used these "true form" charts both for communication and for protection. Regarding their protective function Ge Hong stated: "Having the Album of the True Forms of the Five Marchmounts in your home enables you to deflect violent assault and repulse those who wish to do you harm; they themselves will suffer the calamity they seek to visit upon you." indicating that being in possession of a true form chart can keep its owners safe from potential harm.

According to professor Shih-Shan Susan Huang (黃士珊) true form charts are deliberately designed to be incomprehensible for ordinary people as they are a part of the esoteric teachings of Taoism and can only be read by those who are trained to do so. Taoist rituals have a prominent place in their visual culture and vice versa, with the more esoteric true form charts representing an "outer" ritual dimension that can transform the "inner" experiences. On this Ge Hong commented that during the Eastern Wu dynasty a man by the name of Jie Xiang (介象) was able to read the talismanic script and tell whether it was authentic or inauthentic. Ge Hong claimed that if someone attempted to test him by removing the captions from any therapeutic or apotropaic talisman that Jie Xiang could still tell what was written in them and that he was even able to correct some mistakes in them. However, after Jie Xiang nobody has been able to read the talismanic script meaning that it was impossible to tell if they were right or wrong.

Taoists typically regard the "True Form Chart of the Man-Bird Mountain" (人鳥山真形圖; Rén niǎoshān zhēn xíng tú) and the "True Form Chart of the Five Sacred Peaks" (五嶽真形圖; Wǔyuè zhēn xíng tú) as the two most important true form charts. These charts (albums), which contained images that took the form of esoteric mountain landscapes seen from a bird's-eye view, provided their users with guidance and protection needed during travels through the sacred areas. True form charts symbols are related to the configurations found in feng shui, Chinese calligraphy, traditional Chinese medicine, and traditional Chinese cartography.

"[…] Among important writings on the Way, none surpass the Esoteric Writ of the Three Sovereigns and the True Form Charts of the Five Peaks. The ancients, the immortal officers, and accomplished people respect and keep secret these teachings."

(道書之重者，莫過於三皇內文五岳真形圖也。古人仙官至人，尊祕此道。)

- Ge Hong (葛洪, 283–343) praising the collection of talismans, quoted from his work The Master Who Embraces Simplicity (抱樸子).

=== True Form Chart of the Man-Bird Mountain ===
The True Form Chart of the Man-Bird Mountain (人鳥山真形圖) is usually regarded by scholars as a type of "fairy mountain map" (仙山圖) or a "fairyland picture" (仙境圖). Researchers generally regard this chart as a combined map of an "immortal mountain" (仙山), or "fairyland", with theological and geographic significance. Some scholars directly regard the True Form Chart of the Man-Bird Mountain as the Kunlun Mountains, believing that the "Kunlun Mountain is the Man-Bird Mountain or Spirit-Bird mountain, and the mother of birds is the Queen Mother of the West". However, scholar Cai Linbo concludes that rather than it being a map, like many true form charts, the True Form Chart of the Man-Bird Mountain is actually a description of the mechanism of the {{zhi|out=tr|tr=convergence of celestial and terrestrial qi inside of the human body. Cai argues that the True Form Chart of the Man-Bird Mountain was designed guide novice Taoists in meditation (存思) and activating qi (行氣). In ancient Chinese medicine, the mechanism of the inter-induction of qi (氣交) controls the transmission and transformation of food, circulation of qi-blood in the body, and generation and storage of vital essence. Ancient Taoist priests referred to the mechanism of the inter-induction of qi as "regulating qi in Central Yellow" (黃中理炁).

The exact origins of the True Form Chart of the Man-Bird Mountain are unknown and its creation has been dated to a period ranging from the Northern and Southern dynasties to the Tang dynasty. The origins of the True Form Chart of the Man-Bird Mountain and other "true form charts" are likely inspired by Buddhist works of the 9th and 10th centuries. Xin Deyong (辛德勇), the Picture of the Mystic Vision is “surrounded by explanatory words, obviously with traces of imitating the Buddhist Tantric (陀羅尼) mantras", which is affirmed by Susan Huang who claims that "The text-image juxtaposition resembles the single-sheet design of Buddhist charms known as the "Dhāranī Chart of the True Word" (陀羅尼真言), which were popular in the 9th and 10th centuries". The fact that the Taoists borrowed so heavily from the Buddhists during this period indicates that the Taoist "true form charts" had similar functions as the Buddhist works and likely date from the same period. Despite the esoteric Buddhist inspirations present in the True Form Chart of the Man-Bird Mountain, its origins are still derivative of indigenous ancient cultural traditions, as Huang traced the history of the painting of the Man-Bird (人鳥) and argued that the Man-Bird (人鳥) on the T-shaped silk painting from the Han tomb of Mawangdui and the Man-Bird (人鳥) of Laojun (老君) from the 2nd century AD reflects the tradition of painting the Man-Bird (人鳥圖) in early Chinese art. Taoism drew upon this ancient tradition of drawing the Man-Bird (人鳥) and transformed it into something immortal.

While the layout and function of the True Form Chart of the Man-Bird Mountain may resemble the contemporary Buddhist dhāraṇī, the way it is organised with a bipartite division is inspired by the Taoist concept of yin and yang notion of heaven and earth, as the True Form Chart of the Man-Bird Mountain depicts the earth-part of the mountain while the Taoist fulu script depicts the heaven-part. While Shih-Shan Susan Huang sees the ink-blobs and holes present in the Man-Bird Mountain's true form chart as exoteric and esoteric transmission of their ritual function, Lennert Gesterkamp notes that he thinks that they might represent gestating energies of a grotto-heaven located inside of the mountain.

=== True forms of the Five Sacred Mountains ===
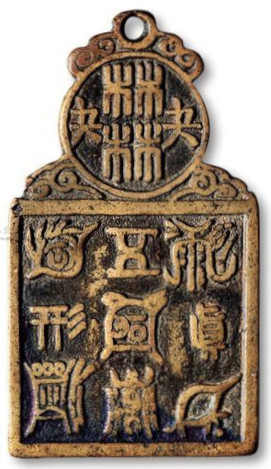
A Qing dynasty period Five Great Mountains talisman based on the Eastern Jin dynasty period "True Forms Chart of the Five Sacred Peaks" (五嶽真形圖; Wǔyuè zhēn xíng tú).

The Five Great Mountains, also known as the Five Marchmounts, are a collection of central Chinese mountains that are regarded as sacred by practitioners of Taoism. These mountains are usually understood to be Mount Tai (泰山), Mount Heng (衡山), Mount Song (嵩山), Mount Hua (華山), and Mount Heng (恆山). Taoists recorded the "True forms of the Five Sacred Mountains" and its surrounding rivers both in true form charts and in talismans (fulu) depicting them as many twists and turns.

The exact origins of the "True Forms Chart of the Five Sacred Peaks" (五嶽真形圖; Wǔyuè zhēn xíng tú) are unknown and it was likely created during the late Han, Wei, or Jin dynasty period.

While the original True Forms Chart of the Five Sacred Peaks no longer exists, many later made copies and map-like charts inspired by it remain important in the Taoist religion. According to the apocryphal preface of the Daozang, attributed to the Han dynasty period scholar-official, fangshi ("master of esoterica"), author, and court jester Dongfang Shuo, the images of the mountains transmitted to later generations as the True Forms Chart of the Five Sacred Peaks were personally drawn by the Yellow Emperor. In 1910 French Sinologist Édouard Chavannes studied the chart and that charts with the title True Forms Chart of the Five Sacred Peaks showcasing inscriptions and pictorial representations of Mount Tai dating from the 14th century onwards. In 1926 the Japanese researcher Inoue Ichii published a detailed study of the complex textual history of the True Forms Chart of the Five Sacred Peaks where he argues that the text entitled Dongxuan lingbao wuyue guben zhenxing tu (洞玄靈寶五嶽古本真形圖) preserved in the Daozang is the oldest extant version of the chart. Inoue notes that the depictions that Édouard Chavannes studied differ markedly from those in Dongxuan lingbao wuyue guben zhenxing tu, and that they derive from a later, post-Tang development of the cult.

On the matter of the origins of the chart, Ge Hong referred to "the techniques of the Writs of the Three Sovereigns for summoning celestial deities and telluric spirits" and speculates that it and the True Forms Chart of the Five Sacred Peaks were originally a single text, where the true form chart's illustrations were simply attached to the Writs of the Three Sovereigns (三皇文).

== In Buddhism ==
Despite attempting to discredit their usage during the Tang dynasty and attempting to revoke the canonical status of the Writs of the Three Sovereigns under the aegis of Emperor Taizong of Tang, practitioners of Buddhism adopted Taoist talismanic writing (fulu) and true form charts around the same time. Chinese Buddhists began to adopt both Taoist talismans and true form charts along with their associated practices, reformulating them to match the Buddhist pantheons, metaphysical concepts, and cosmologies. This adoption occurred sometime during the late 6th century and was political in nature, as these Taoist concepts were already known and used in elite circles at the time and would grant the Buddhists more political legitimacy, as the usage of both talismans and true form charts were pervasive indigenous Chinese implements that surfaced in state-sponsored cultic rituals and juridical-administrative rituals, this adoption made the Buddhists a more "legitimate" religious group as they were vying with the Taoists for imperial sponsorship.

Because of the religious use of Taoist talismanic "magic writing" and true form charts in Chinese and Japanese Buddhism, they have essentially become "clean-slate receptacles for, and simultaneously, vectors of first-order meaning" due to their illegibility causing the same talisman or chart to refer to a local Daoist river god as well as to Vidyārāja, be a representation of the interior space of a sacred mountain in Taoist theology or the structure of the Vajradhātu to a Buddhist depending on which religion the person follows. Despite this fact, both talismanic writing and true form charts often have some permanent second-order semantic meaning beyond their variable interpretation.

While the Sino-Japanese Taishō Tripiṭaka includes numerous references to Taoist talismanic writing, the Taoist true form charts are noticeably absent from the work. Dominic Steavu, a scholar of Chinese religions, speculates that this might be the case because the notion of the "true form" might've been to closely associated with Taoism while the fu writing style was seen as "more generic". Furthermore, Steavu notes that Buddhists already had a notion that was equivalent to "true forms" known as "Samaya embodiments" (三昧耶身) and "Samaya forms" (三昧耶形 or 三形) which could bridge the Taoist concept. In Buddhism, these terms are references to allusions for the spiritual essence fundamental to the divine being of buddhas and bodhisattvas, meaning that the concept was similar to one of the earliest Taoist interpretations of talismanic writing as the word samaya could be rendered as "joining together", a relationship also found in Taoist "true names" and "true forms". In Buddhist sources, samaya are sometimes represented in a manner similar to true form charts where they graphically and integrated into diagrams.

== See also ==
- Map–territory relation
- Theory of forms
- True name
- Xian (Taoism)

== Sources ==
- Huang, Shih-Shan Susan (黃士珊) (2012). Picturing the True Form: Daoist Visual Culture in Traditional China. Harvard East Asian Monographs 342. Vol. 342. Harvard University Asia Center. doi:10.1163/9781684175161. ISBN 9780674065734. JSTOR j.ctt1x07w1q.
- von Glahn, Richard (2004). The Sinister Way. University of California Press. doi:10.1525/california/9780520234086.001.0001. ISBN 9780520234086.
