= Taoist coin charm =

Chinese and Vietnamese numismatic charms

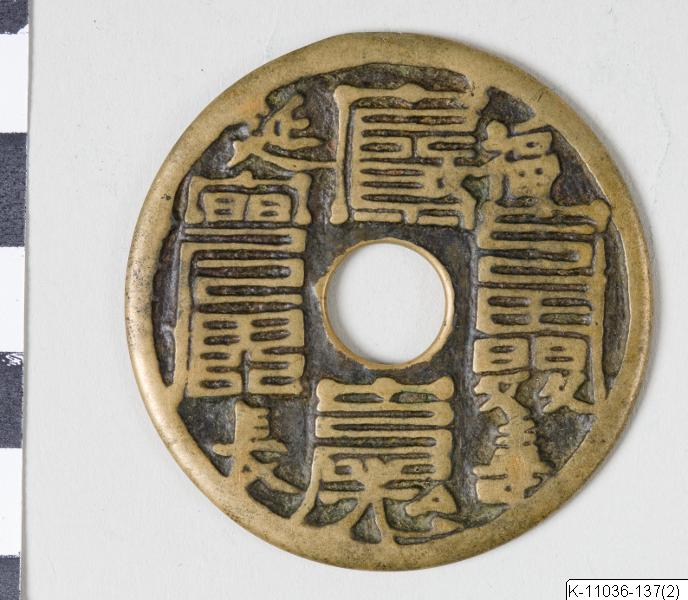
A Taoist charm that contains Taoist "magic writing" on display at the Museum of Ethnography, Sweden

Taoist coin charms (simplified Chinese: 道教品压生钱; traditional Chinese: 道教品壓生錢; pinyin: dào jiào pǐn yā shēng qián), or Daoist coin charms are a family of categories of Chinese and Vietnamese numismatic charms that incorporate elements of the Taoist religion. Taoist coin charms come in various shapes, sizes, and formats and can contain inscriptions or wholly pictorial designs. While a large number of Taoist coin charms have their inscriptions written in traditional Chinese characters, a subset of Taoist coin charms have inscriptions written in Taoist "magic" writing. In these countries similar numismatic charms existed for Buddhist and Confucianism, and at times Taoist coin charms would also incorporate symbolism from these other religions.

In the case of these coins, "charm" in this context is a catchall term for coin-shaped items which were not official (or counterfeit) money. However, these numismatic objects were not necessarily considered "magical" or "lucky", as some of these Chinese numismatic charms can be used as "mnemonic coins".

== Themes and types of Taoist coin charms ==
Since ancient times, the Chinese had attributed magical powers and influence to Hanzi characters. They believed that certain characters could impact spirits, which were in turn believed to be responsible for good and ill fortune. The Huainanzi describes spirits as horror-stricken at being commanded by the magical powers of the Hanzi characters used for amulets and charms. Many early Han dynasty talismans were worn as pendants containing inscriptions requesting that people who were deified in the Taoist religion to lend them protection. Some Taoist charms contain inscriptions based on Taoist "magic writing" (Chinese: 符文, also known as Taoist magic script characters, Taoist magic figures, Taoist magic formulas, Taoist secret talismanic writing, and Talismanic characters) which is a secret writing style regarded as part of Fulu. Its techniques are passed from Taoist priests to their students and differ between Taoist sects, with a secrecy that led many people to believe that they would have more effect in controlling the will of the spirits.

As the majority of these charms asked Leigong (the Taoist God of Thunder) to kill the evil spirits or bogies, these numismatic charms are often called "Lei Ting" charms (雷霆錢) or "Lei Ting curse" charms. As imperial decrees had absolute authority, this reinforced the popular myth that Hanzi characters were somehow magical, and inspired Chinese talismans to take the forms of imperial decrees. Many Taoist talismans read as if by a high-rank official commanding the evil spirits and bogies with inscriptions such as "let it [the command] be executed as fast as Lü Ling", (Note: Lü Ling was an ancient Chinese runner from the Zhou dynasty during the Mu Wang era in the 10th century BC.) "quickly, quickly, this is an order", and "[pay] respect [to] this command". Taoist talismans can contain either square holes or round ones. Many Taoist amulets and charms contain images of Liu Haichan, Zhenwu, the Bagua, yin-yang symbols, constellations, Laozi, swords, bats, and immortals.

A Taoist charm from either the Jin or Yuan dynasty without any written text shows what is commonly believed to be either a "boy under a pine tree" (松下童子) or a "boy worshipping an immortal" (童子拜仙人), but an alternative hypothesis is that this charm depicts a meeting between Laozi and Zhang Daoling. This is based on the fact that the figure supposedly representing Zhang Daoling is carrying a cane which in Mandarin Chinese is a homophone for "Zhang". On the reverse side of the charm are the twelve Chinese zodiacs, each in a circle surrounded by what is referred to as "auspicious clouds" which number eight.

=== Coin-swords ===
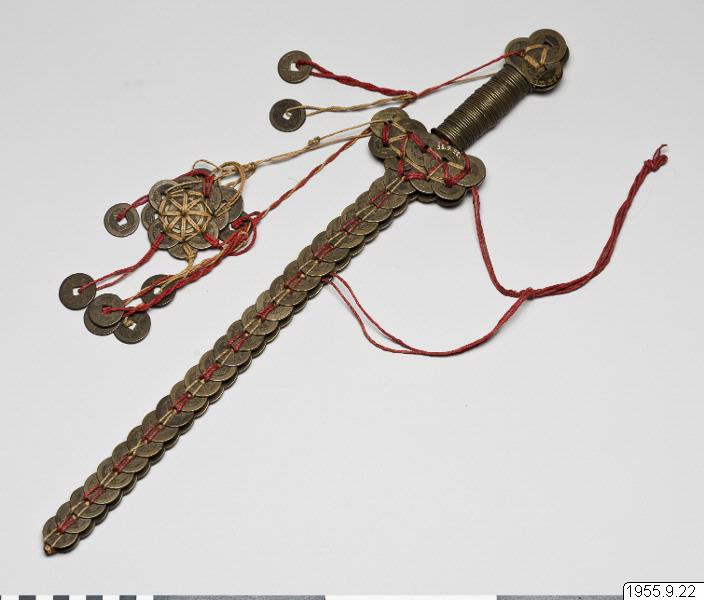
A Chinese coin sword-shaped talisman made from Qing dynasty era cash coins on display at the Museum of Ethnography, Sweden

Coin-swords (alternatively spelt as coin swords), alternatively known as cash-swords, are a type of Chinese numismatic charms that are a form of feng shui talisman that were primarily used in southern China to ward off evil spirits and malicious influences, especially those inducing fever. These coin-swords are also often used in Taoist rituals. In Mandarin Chinese, coin-sword are called bì xié jiàn (避邪劍) which literally translates into English to "evil-warding sword".

Coin-swords usually consist of Qing dynasty era cash coins, specifically from the Kangxi and Qianlong eras, but may also be made from older cash coins.

Chinese coin-swords generally consist of either one or two iron rods as a foundation with real or replica Chinese cash coins fastened together with a string, a cord, or a wire which are usually coloured red. While the thread is usually red, it may sometimes also be yellow or gold as these are considered to be the colours of royalty.

A typical Chinese coin-sword is about 0.6 meter, or about 2 feet in the imperial system of units, long and consists of around one hundred copper-alloy Chinese cash coins. In superstition it is usually considered better for all the Chinese cash coins strung together in the coin-sword to have been produced during the reign of only a single Chinese emperor, and may not be mixed with cash coins from other dynasties. Ancient Chinese cash coins are also generally preferred over more modern ones. Coin-swords are constructed out of three different kinds of things, each of which is regarded as a preventive of evil spirits in feng shui.

A popular way sword symbolism in integrated in Chinese numismatic talismans is by stringing actual or replicas of cash coins into a sword-shape. In feng shui, these coin-swords are often hung to frighten away demons and evil spirits. Coin-swords are frequently hung above the bed, on residential walls, on the front and the outside of the bridal bed-curtain, or above the windows of a building. It is believed that evil spirits would not dare molest the residents of the house where the coin-sword hangs because the sword resembles that wielded by the Taoist immortal Zhong Kui, who in Chinese mythology is famous for being a slayer of evil demons. Most Chinese coin-swords consist of Qianlong Tongbao (乾隆通寳) cash coins.

The supposed powers of coin-swords do not come from the associated wealth symbolism that usually comes with cash coins. But with the design form of the cash coins used to make the sword, as well as the dynastic origins of the cash coins that carry the Emperor's reign era title. As such, in feng shui the supposed power of the coin-swords will depend heavily on which Chinese emperor's inscription is written down on the cash coins.

About the time of a woman's confinement after her marriage, a coin-sword is sometimes taken to be hung inside of the bridal bed-curtain, usually in a position that is parallel to the horizon.

Coin-swords made from Qing dynasty cash coins with the inscription Kangxi Tongbao (康熙通寶) are considered to be the most effective. This is because the reign of the Kangxi Emperor of the Qing dynasty lasted an entire 60-year cycle of the Chinese calendar and thus according to feng shui cash coins with this inscription represent "longevity". These cash coins are furthermore preferred because the name "Kangxi" means "good health" and "prosperity".

=== Eight Treasures charms ===
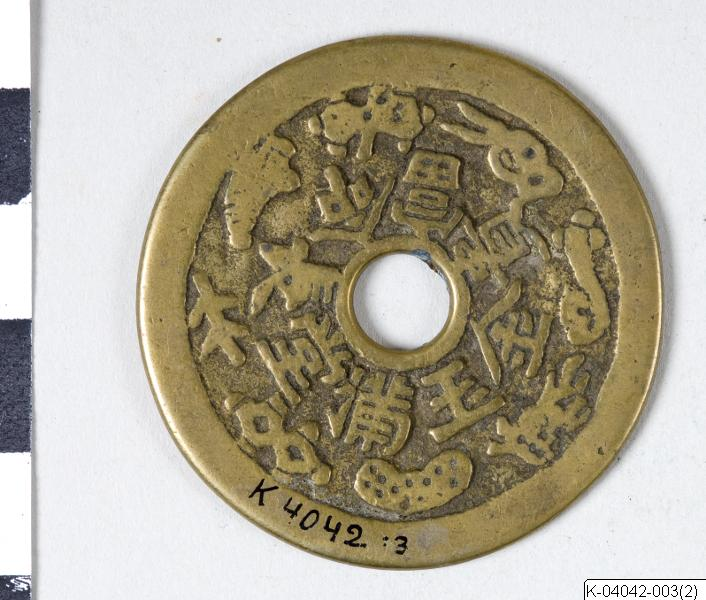
An Eight Treasures charm with the inscription 長命富貴金玉滿堂 which could be translated as "longevity, wealth and honor", "may gold and jade fill your house (halls)" on display at the Museum of Ethnography, Sweden

Chinese Eight Treasures charms (simplified Chinese: 八宝钱; traditional Chinese: 八寶錢; pinyin: bā bǎo qián) depict the Eight Treasures, also known as the "Eight Precious Things" and the "Eight Auspicious Treasures", and refer to a subset of a large group of items from antiquity known as the "Hundred Antiques" (百古) which consists of objects utilised in the writing of Chinese calligraphy such as painting brushes, ink, writing paper and ink slabs, as well as other antiques such as Chinese chess, paintings, musical instruments and various others. Those most commonly depicted on older charms are the ceremonial ruyi (sceptre), coral, lozenge, rhinoceros horns, sycees, stone chimes, and flaming pearl. Eight Treasures charms can alternatively display the eight precious organs of the Buddha's body, the eight auspicious signs, various emblems of the eight Immortals from Taoism, or eight normal Chinese character. They often have thematic inscriptions.

=== Fu inscriptions on Taoist talismanic coins ===
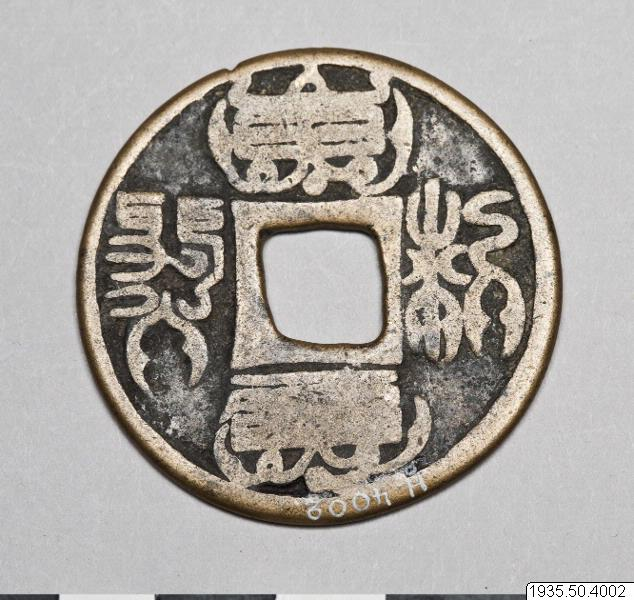
A Taoist charm or talisman coin that contains Taoist "magic writing" on display at the Museum of Ethnography, Sweden

Fu script was also used on Taoist coin talismans (many of which resemble cash coins), many of these talismans have not been deciphered yet but a specimen where Fu was used next to what is believed to be their equivalent Chinese characters exists. On rare occasions Taoist Fu writing has also been found on Buddhist numismatic charms and amulets. Most of these coin talismans that feature Fu writings request Lei Gong to protect its carriers from evil spirits and misfortune. Fulu characters are usually included at the beginning and the end of the inscription of a Taoist coin charm.

=== Lei Ting curse charms ===
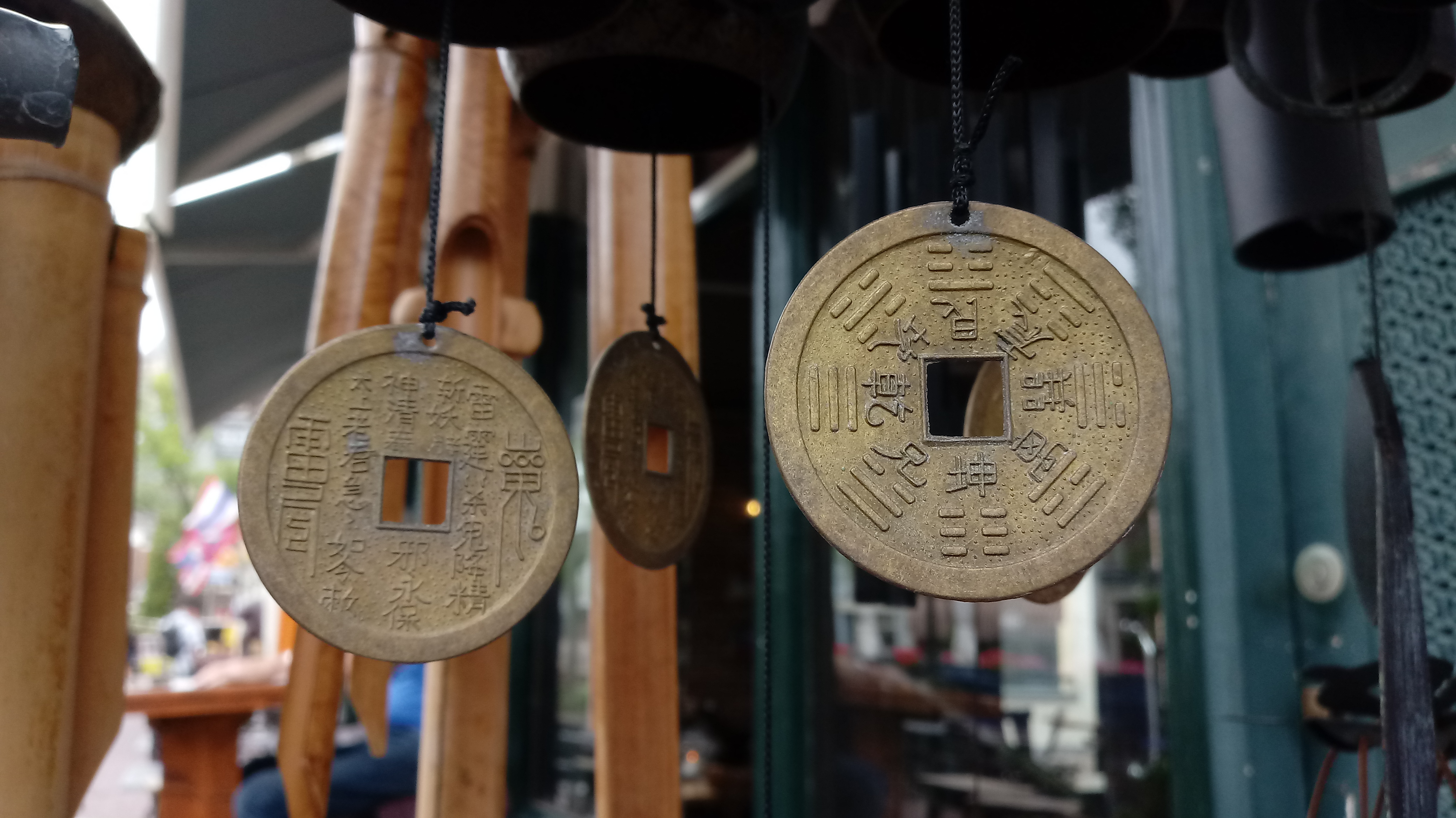
Modern machine-made Lei Ting curse charms containing Taoist imagery in Delft, Netherlands

Lei Ting curse charms (simplified Chinese: 符咒钱; traditional Chinese: 符咒錢; pinyin: fú zhòu qián), or Lôi Đình curse charms, are a type of Chinese and Vietnamese numismatic charms, these charms can be described as a talismanic coin as they are often based on Chinese cash coins but can also have round holes instead of square ones and may also be shaped like gourd charms.

Lei Ting curse charms contain inscriptions that request the Taoist God of Thunder Leigong to expel evil spirits and maleficent bogies through a magical spell incantation which usually calls upon Leigong by claiming that the inscription is in fact an order from Laozi himself. In some cases these coin charms request that Leigong should act "with the speed of Lü Ling", a famous sprinter from the 10th century BCE around the time Mu Wang of the Zhou dynasty reigned over China.

The name "Lei Ting" (雷霆) comes from Lei (雷) which is an abbreviation for Leigong (雷公) or Leishen (雷神), god of thunder and one the officials in the celestial Ministry of Thunder and Storm who could punish on behalf of Heaven; and Ting ("thunderbolt") as these thunderbolts would be used for the destruction of malicious spirits. It is not uncommon for the characters Lei (雷), Ling (令; "to order"), Sha (杀; "to kill"), and Gui (鬼; "spirit" or "ghost") on Lei Ting curse charms at both extremes of the inscription to be written in Taoist Fuwen as opposed to with Hanzi characters, and although the religious sects and orders of Taoism usually wish for the meaning of Fuwen characters to remain a secret the Fu characters used for these terms are actually well known.

The term "Lei Ting curse charm" is a term used primarily by Chinese collectors for these coin charms.

Lei Ting curse charms are an evolution of the ancient Chinese belief that everything is controlled by spirits and evil spirits should be dealt with in the same manner as human adversaries should be treated, in Ancient China a large number of exorcists would roam the streets and throw spears into the air to scare evil spirits away, at the same time human prisoners would have their limbs dismembered and would be openly displayed outside the city gates to scare evil spirits away proclaiming that the same fate shall fall upon them if they dare go into the city. According to Chinese legends Hanzi characters were created by the Yellow Emperor after "the millet fell from the heavens and the spirits cried at night", this was because legends describe spirits of being afraid of being controlled by "the magical properties of Chinese characters" as described in the Huainanzi. As Hanzi characters were used on amulets magical powers were prescribed to them by the superstitious, during the Han dynasty Chinese numismatic charms started to be worn as pendants to protect its wearers from the influence of bogies and evil spirits. Leigong became one of the most commonly requested Taoist Gods to request for protection.

The ancient Chinese people believed that decrees and mandates issued by the government had absolutely authoritative power over them which expanded their belief that Hanzi characters somehow had magical properties. Taoist exorcists and priests claimed that they could use Hanzi characters and Fu script to make decrees that influence the spiritual world, for this reason the inscriptions of Lei Ting curse charms resemble official decrees and documents issued by the government of imperial China but ordered by Laozi and the person being decreed was Leigong whose job it is to punish people guilty of moral crimes such as unfilial sons or daughter as well as evil entities using the Taoist magic to harm others. The reason why Laozi was selected to be the one decreeing the order was because he was a prestigious figure who had the power needed to enforce said decree. In some cases rather than Leigong Laozi himself was used to either scare away or kill bogies and malicious spirits. Laozi is often referred to as tài shàng lǎo jūn (太上老君) on Lei Ting curse charms, this title was posthumously given to him by the Emperor of the Song dynasty in the year 1013 AD. Like government decrees, inscriptions on Lei Ting curse charms would carry phrases such as "quickly, quickly, this is an order" or "respect this command". Some curse charms contain the Chinese character for "dead ghost"; just as a regular ghost is a living person who has died, the ancient Chinese people believed that ghosts themselves feared "dead ghosts".

Lei Ting curses appear on a wide variety of Chinese and Vietnamese numismatic charms such as those containing Taoist "magic" writing, a type of secret script used by Taoist priests which ancient Chinese people assigned magical properties to, charms containing images of various other Taoist deities such as Xuanwu, and other Lei Ting curse charms can have Taoist symbols on their reverse such as the Bagua (eight trigrams).

These amulets were traditionally bought from Taoist masters and because they were often written in an exotic style and using Taoist "magic" writing, it was not uncommon for the inscriptions to be only readable by the Taoist masters who issued them.

=== Liu Haichan and the Three-Legged Toad charms ===
These charms depict Taoist transcendent Liu Haichan, one of the most popular figures on Chinese charms, and the Jin Chan (money frog). The symbolism of these charms has regional differences, as in some varieties of Chinese the character "chan" has a pronunciation very similar to that of "coin" (錢; qián). The mythical Jin Chan lives on the moon, and these charms symbolize wishing for that which is "unattainable". This can be interpreted as attracting good fortune to the charm's holder, or that the attainment of money can lure a person to their downfall.

=== Peach charms ===
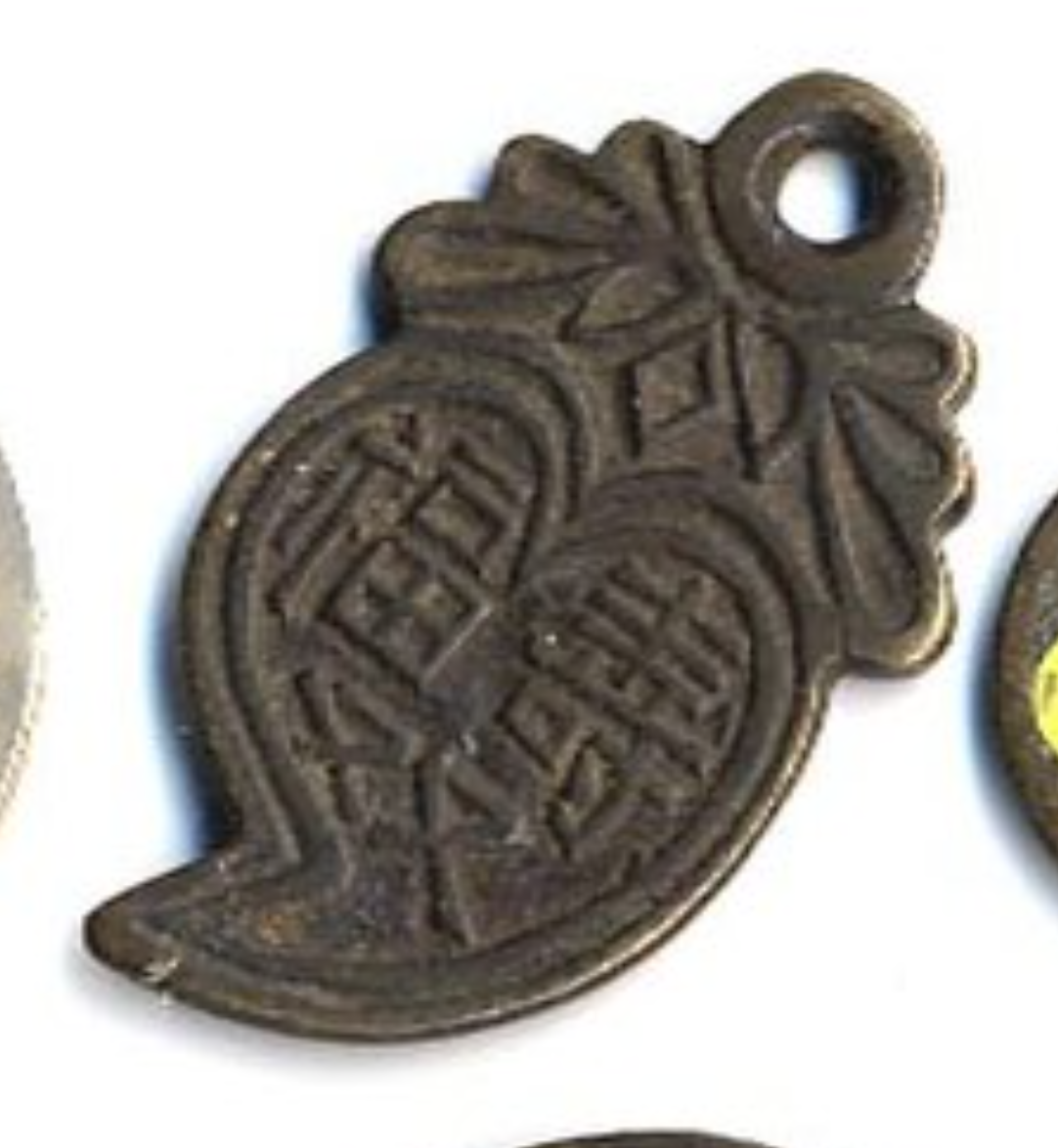
A Chinese peach charm for "good luck" (福) and "longevity" (壽)

Chinese peach charms (simplified Chinese: 桃形挂牌; traditional Chinese: 桃形掛牌; pinyin: táo xíng guà pái) are peach-shaped charms used to wish for longevity. The ancient Chinese believed the peach tree to possess vitality as its blossoms appeared before leaves sprouted. Chinese Emperors would write the character for longevity (壽) to those of the lowest social class if they had reached high ages, which was seen to be among the greatest gifts. This character often appears on peach charms and other Chinese numismatic charms. Peach charms also often depict the Queen Mother of the West or carry inscriptions such as "long life" (長命; cháng mìng). Peach charms were also used to wish for wealth depicting the character "富" or higher Mandarin ranks using the character "貴".

=== Quest for Longevity charms ===
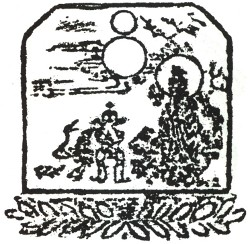
A rubbing of a Song dynasty period "Quest for Longevity" Taoist numismatic charm

During the Song dynasty, a number of Taoist charms depicting the "Quest for Longevity" were cast. These contain images of an immortal, incense burner, crane, and a tortoise on the obverse and Taoist "magic writing" on the reverse. Taoist charms containing the quest for immortality are a common motif and reproductions of this charm were commonly made after the Song period. Some Taoist charms from the Qing dynasty contain images of Lü Dongbin with the inscription fú yòu dà dì (孚佑大帝, "Great Emperor of Trustworthy Protection"). This charm notably contains a round hole.

=== Safe journey charms ===
Safe journey charms are a major category of Chinese numismatic charms, which were produced out of a concern for personal safety while traveling. One side would usually have an inscription wishing for the holder of the charm to be granted a safe journey, while the other would have common talisman themes such as the Bagua, weapons, and stars. It is believed that the Boxers used safe journey charms as "badges" of membership during their rebellion against the Manchu Qing dynasty.

The inscription of this safe journey coin charm, which is written in seal script, reads shui lu ping an (水魯平安) which literally translates into English as "may you have peace by land and water" or, more simply translated, "I wish you a safe journey", as was its implied meaning. The reverse side of this Chinese numismatic charm has a rather unusual mix of Chinese coin charm symbols.

On the reverse side of this safe journey coin charm located right above the square hole are 7 dots, which on this safe journey cash coin is connected by a zigzag line, that represents the star constellation known as the "Big Dipper" (or the "Ladle"). Below the square centre hole is located one of the Chinese eight trigrams. This is the trigram kǎn (坎), which represents the concept of "water", as well as the wind direction "north". According to Taoism, there nothing softer or weaker than the element of water, but water can wear away even the hardest substance. The kǎn trigram in this context is thus a symbol that a mass movement of Chinese peasants would be able to defeat the smaller but better equipped and modern standing army of Western "devils" that fought the boxers during their rebellion.

To the left and right of the square centre hole are ancient Chinese blade weapons, which were also used by the Boxers during their rebellion. The weapon depicted to the left of the square centre hole is a guan dao of Guan Yu (or the "Green Dragon Crescent Blade"), the notch in the guan dao was to catch and parry the enemy's weapon in a combat situation. The linking of the "Big Dipper" star constellation with Chinese swords established the belief that the blade weapons could be used not only in wars against human enemies but in battles against evil spirits as well.

The image of a weapon located to the right of the square centre hole is known as a "Chinese Trident", which is a weapon that was primarily used for hunting animals, but one which could also be thrown to kill the hunter's prey.

The images of the bladed weapons, the "Big Dipper" with zigzag lines and the kǎn (or "water") trigram, along with the association of Guan Yu, combined to supposedly provide powerful protection to a person whether he traveled either by land or by sea.

=== Sword symbolism in Taoist numismatic charms ===
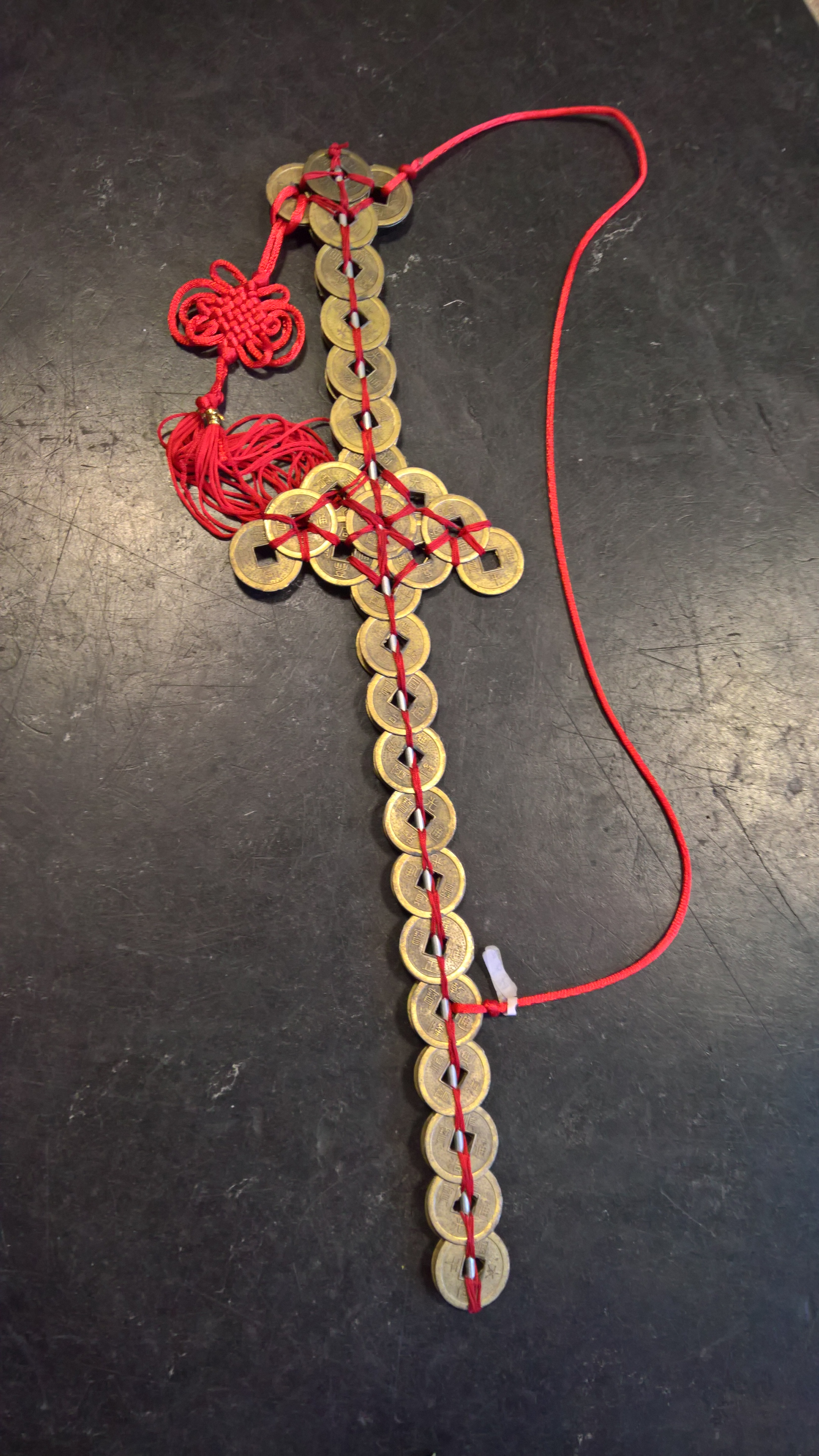
A modern coin-sword made from replicas of Qing dynasty cash coins in Winschoten, Groningen

True Chinese numismatic charms and amulets did not begin to appear in China until sometime during the Han dynasty and the sword, or frequently a pair of swords, as objects invested with power became frequently seen symbols in Chinese numismatic charms from this time on.

Swords are a common theme on Chinese numismatic charms, and coins were often assembled into sword-shaped talismans. Most Chinese numismatic charms that feature swords often show a single sword. According to Chinese legends, the first swords in China appeared under the reign of the legendary Yellow Emperor. During the Spring and Autumn period, the notion developed that swords could be used against evil spirits and demons. Under the Liu Song dynasty swords became a common instrument in religious rituals, most particularly in Taoist rituals; according to the Daoist Rituals of the Mystery Cavern and Numinous Treasure (洞玄靈寶道學科儀) it was essential for students of Taoism to be able to forge swords which had the capability to dispel demonic entities. Many Taoist sects formed during this period believed that swords could defeat demons and also contained medical properties. Under the Sui and Tang dynasties ritualistic swords constructed of peach wood started to appear. Around this time, Chinese amulets with sword themes began to be produced; often these amulets resembled Chinese cash coins but had crossed swords decorated with ribbons or fillets on them, as the ancient Chinese believed that these items enhanced the powers of the item they were tied to. Chinese swords were commonly engraved with imagery representing the Big Dipper, which was believed to have unlimited magical power, and this also became common for charms that featured swords.

The image of two swords on Chinese amulets stems from a legend where Taoist leader Zhang Daoling saw Laozi appear to him on a mountain in present-day Sichuan and gave him two swords. Alternatively, two swords can also represent two dragons from a legend where a man named Lei Huan (雷煥) received two swords and gave one to his son Lei Hua (雷華), who lost it in a river; a servant tasked with retrieving it witnessed two coiled and entwined Chinese dragons.

Chinese talismans of swordsmen usually depict one of the Taoist immortals Zhong Kui or Lu Dongbin. Swordsmen also appear on zodiac charms, Bagua charms, elephant chess pieces, lock charms, and other Chinese numismatic charms. Another person who appears on Chinese amulets is Zhenwu, who is regarded as the perfect warrior.

Taoist priests use coin-swords because of this symbolism for rituals for ridding evil, a red cloth is then wrapped on the hilt of the sword. Taoist priests can also sometimes use a peach wood sword as an alternative to coin-swords.

=== Taoist pendant charms ===
Chinese Taoist-themed pendant charms (simplified Chinese: 道教品挂牌; traditional Chinese: 道教品掛牌; pinyin: dào jiào pǐn guà pái) are Chinese numismatic charms that are used as decorative pendants. From the beginning of the Han dynasty, Chinese people began wearing these charms around their necks or waists as pendants, or attached these charms to the rafters of their houses, pagodas, temples or other buildings, as well as on lanterns. It is believed that open-work charms may have been the first Chinese charms that were used in this fashion. Fish, lock, spade, and peach charms were worn on a daily basis, with fish and lock charms worn mainly by young children and infants. Other charms were exclusively used for specific rituals or holidays. Some Han dynasty era charms contained inscriptions such as ri ru qian jin (日入千金; "may you earn a 1,000 gold everyday"), chu xiong qu yang (除凶去央; "do away with evil and dispel calamity"), bi bing mo dang (辟兵莫當; "avoid hostilities and ward off sickness"), or chang wu xiang wang (長毋相忘; "do not forget your friends"). Others resembled contemporary cash coins with added dots and stars. Some pendant charms had a single loop while most others also had either a square or round hole in the centre. Some Chinese pendant charms contain the Hanzi character guà (挂; "to hang"), though their form makes their purpose obvious. Although most pendant charms contain pictorial illustrations, the association of Chinese characters into new and mystical symbolic forms reached an even greater extreme when Taoists introduced "Taoist magic writing" (符文).

==== Dragon zodiac Changming Fugui amulets ====
There is a Song dynasty period Taoist pendant (plaque) charm with the inscription Changming Fugui written as "長命冨貴" instead of "長命富貴". (Note: Writing the fù (富) as "冨" is known in mandarin as Fù zì wú tóu (traditional Chinese: 富字無頭; simplified Chinese: 富字无头, "fù character without a top or limit"). This implies that in this case the character fù refers to "riches without an end" or "Endless riches" as opposed to simply meaning "riches" as the fù with a dotted top. the top of the Chinese character is written as 冖 (mi; "cover") instead of 宀 (mian; "roof"), meaning that the small dot, or vertical line, at the top of the fù character is missing.) This amulet is 31.5 millimeters in length and 24.5 millimeters in width. The reverse side of this amulet depicts a Taoist deity known as the Star Official of Dominant Vitality (本命星官), depicted with a halo around his head, wearing a long robe, and holding a Hu. Above the head of the Star Official of Dominant Vitality is a raised dot representing the moon. Some numismatists believe that the depiction of the Star Official of Dominant Vitality is done in the style of the Tang dynasty period painter Wu Daozi, specifically in the style of the painting "The Eighty-seven Immortals" (八十七神仙圖), which is As of 2021 at the Xu Beihong Memorial Museum (徐悲鴻紀念館) in Beijing. In Daoist thought, it is believed that each person is protected by the star god associated with the zodiacal year in which that person was born, as the charm depicts a dragon this charm is likely for those born in the year of the dragon. Above the dragon is a round object representing the sun. Inside of the it is the Chén (辰) character, which is the 5th of the Chinese Earthly branches, which also references the dragon zodiac.

Both the inscription on the obverse side and images on the reverse side confirm that this amulet is in fact a "good luck" charm. These types of charms were typically given to a newborn child or an infant having reached one-month of age, which in traditional Chinese culture is known as the mǎn yuè (满月). Due to its symbolism and association with the Star Official of Dominant Vitality, this Song dynasty period charm would have been especially appropriate for a young child that born in the Chinese year of the dragon.

In 2009 one of these Song dynasty period amulets sold at the Chengxuan auction for $380 (¥2464).

==== Five Great Mountains talismans ====
During the Eastern Jin dynasty period in Chinese history the appearance of map-like charts began to be used as a guide in understanding the ultimate reality, i.e. the "true form” of things (真形; Zhēn xíng) according to Taoist thought, during Taoist pilgrimages to the sacred Five Great Mountains. According to Taoist thought the concept of a "true form" is the original, formless, inner shape of the mountain, as part of the Dao ((道)), as opposed to its physical, visible, outer shape in the material world. In Taoist thought it is believed that if one can understand the true form of an object or a spirit, one can have a modicum of control over it. Broadly speaking, the concept of a "true form" can apply to a deity, an icon, a purified self, a talisman, or a picture. In Taoism the "true form" denotes the original shape something has as part of Dao, the inherent potency of an object, place, or a person as expressed in physical form, perfect form, etc. Seeing "true forms" requires both religious discipline and practice. In many cases, Taoists associate the "true form" with the inner, invisible, and formless quality of an entity, contrary to the outer, the visible, and the concrete (see also: Theory of forms).

People who were accustomed to living in the plains and valleys were typically less familiar with the topography of mountainous areas, the weather there, as well as the geology. People from the plains and valleys feared the tigers and other "strange beasts" as well as the idea that these places were populated by local spirits and demons. In the Taoist religion it is thought that sacred sites in the highest of places and, in particular, mountains and caves, are the very heart of a mountain and were a fountain of the vital life force known as Qi. According to ancient Taoist beliefs these sites surrounding mountains included forests and streams where one could find various types of medicinal plants and the ingredients for elixirs of life and pills of immortality.

Taoists advocate rigorous meditation and visualisation as the most efficient way to see the "true form" of any object, so Taoists frequently use a visual symbol known as the "true form chart" (真形圖, zhēn xíng tú) to visualise the "true form" of something. It was during the Eastern Jin dynasty period that the "True Forms Chart of the Five Sacred Peaks" (五岳真形图; 五嶽真形圖; Wǔyuè zhēn xíng tú) was written. This book included a chart that supposedly illustrated the "true forms" of the 5 sacred mountains in Taoism. According to Ge Hong having a copy of the Wǔyuè zhēn xíng tú in your home enables you to deflect violent assault and repulse those who wish to do you harm, this is why charts based on this work appear on a number of Taoist plaque charms. Taoists later created talismans (charms) which displayed these charts. A talisman was more conveniently carried on the wearer and would provide protection for those who sought the Dao in the sacred mountains of China as they would journey through them. In Taoism, a talisman is a charm that includes fulu.

“Others do not understand how to wear the divine talismans at their belt. Some do not obtain the methods to enter the mountains and let the mountain deities bring calamities to them. Goblins and demons will put them to the test, wild animals will wound them, poisons from pools will hit them, and snakes will bite them. There will be not one but many prospects of death.”

— Ge Hong (葛洪), Baopuzi (抱樸子).

Plaque amulets with the inscription Wuyue Zhenxing (五岳真形; 五嶽真形; "true form of the five peaks") were produced that were intended to be protective talismans that were carried by Taoist pilgrims through the sacred mountains.

During the reign of the Qing dynasty one such amulet contained the inscription at the 12, 3, 6 and 9 o’clock positions are Chinese seal script characters. Reading top (五, Wǔ), bottom (嶽, Yuè), right (真, Zhēn), and left (形, Xíng). This amulet notably includes the "charts" ("true form" maps) of each of the Five Sacred Mountains of Taoism. In 2008 this Qing dynasty period charm sold at auction for $3,900 (¥25,300).

=== Taoist symbolism on Buddhist coin charms ===
Some Buddhist coin charms contain various forms of Taoist symbolism such as the Yin-Yang symbol and Taoist "magic" writing.

=== The Book of Changes and Bagua charms (Eight Trigram charms) ===
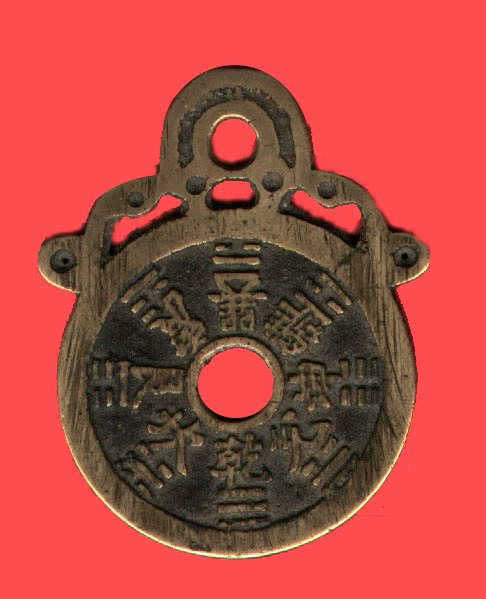
A Chinese amulet with the eight trigrams

Chinese charms depicting illustrations and subjects from the I Ching (a.k.a. The Book of Changes) are used to wish for the cosmic principles associated with divination in ancient China, such as simplicity, variability, and persistence. Bagua charms may also depict the Bagua (the Eight Trigrams of Taoist cosmology). Bagua charms commonly feature depictions of trigrams, the Yin Yang symbol, Neolithic jade congs (琮), the Ruyi sceptre, bats, and cash coins.

Book of Changes and Bagua charms are alternatively known as Yinyang charms (陰陽錢) because the taijitu is often found with the eight trigrams. This is also a popular theme for Vietnamese numismatic charms and many Vietnamese versions contain the same designs and inscriptions.

Vietnamese Book of Changes and Bagua charms often include inscriptions that contain compound words meaning "longevity" and "immortality".

=== Vietnamese marriage amulets ===
Several Vietnamese marriage amulets contain images of cranes surrounding the Taijitu, in this context the yin symbolizes the wife, while the yang symbolizes the husband.

=== Zodiac charms ===
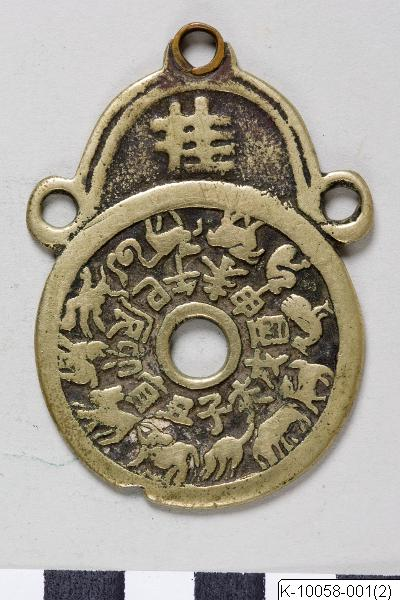
A charm depicting the 12 Chinese zodiacs on display at the Östasiatiska Museet

Chinese zodiac charms are based on either the twelve animals or the twelve earthly branches of Chinese astrology, based on the orbit of Jupiter, and some zodiac charms feature stellar constellations. By the time of the Spring and Autumn period, the twelve earthly branches associated with the months and the twelve animals became linked; during the Han dynasty these also became linked to a person's year of birth. Some zodiac charms featured all twelve animals and others might also include the twelve earthly branches. They often feature the character gua (挂), which indicates that the charm should be worn on a necklace or from the waist. Modern feng shui charms often incorporate the same zodiac-based features.

== List of Taoist coin charm variants by inscription ==
List of Taoist coin charm inscriptions (except for Lei Ting curse charms):

List of Taoist coin charm inscriptions (except for Lei Ting curse charms)
Transliteration	Traditional Chinese	Simplified Chinese	Literal English translation	Meaning	Image
Chun feng tao li	春風桃李	春风桃李	"Peach trees and plum trees blossomed in the winds of spring" "Gone were the breezy spring days when the peach and plum trees were in bloom"	An excerpt from a poem by Tang dynasty poet Bai Juyi.	
Fu shou yan chang	福壽延長	福寿延长	"Good fortune and longevity for a long time"	Good fortune and longevity for a long time.	
Fu you da di	孚佑大帝	孚佑大帝	"Great Emperor of Trustworthy Protection"	Auspicious inscription.	
Fu yu xian lang di yi zhi	付與仙朗第 一枝	付与仙朗第一枝	"To give to an immortal young gentleman the first branch"	Auspicious inscription.	
Han shan bi you	寒山庇佑	寒山庇佑	"Hanshan protect" "Hanshan bless"	Protection by Hanshan.	
Baixian Changshou	百仙長壽	百仙长寿	"Hundred immortals" or "hundred fairies." "long life" or "longevity."	Unknown.	
Jiang fu bi xie	降福避邪	降福避邪	"Send down good fortune and keep away evil"	Auspicious inscription.	
Changsheng Baomimg	長生保命	长生保命	"Long life and protect life."	A request for longevity.	
Ba gua liu yao	八卦六爻	八卦六爻	"The eight trigrams and the six stacked lines (which make up a hexagram)"	Daoist imagery.	
Qu xie jiang fu	驅邪降福	驱邪降福	"Expel evil and send down good fortune (happiness)"	Protection from evil spirits.	
San xian	三仙	三仙	"Three Immortals"	Sanxing.	
Shui lu ping an	水魯平安	水魯平安	"May you have peace by land and water"	A wish for a safe journey.	
Yuan tian shang di	元天上帝	元天上帝	"Supreme Lord of the Primal Heaven"	Alternative name of Laozi.	
Zhang guo lao xian	張果老仙	张果老仙	"The Immortal Zhang Guolao"	Zhang Guolao.	
Zhu shen hui bi	諸神回避	诸神回避	"Evade all the spirits"	Protection from evil spirits.	
Fuyou Dadi	孚佑大帝	孚佑大帝	"Great Emperor of Trustworthy Protection."	Lu Dongbin	

== Sources ==
- Doolittle, Justus (1868). Social Life of the Chinese: A Daguerreotype of Daily Life in China. London: S. Low, Son, and Marston. pp. 563–565.
- Greenbaum, Craig (2006). Amulets of Vietnam.
- Hartill, David (September 22, 2005). Cast Chinese Coins. Trafford, United Kingdom: Trafford Publishing. ISBN 978-1412054669.
- Edgar J. Mandel. Metal Charms and Amulets of China.
- Zheng, Yiwei, ed. (2004). 花钱图典 [Classic Chinese Charms] (in Chinese). China: Wen Hua Press.
- Great Dictionary of China Numismatics (中國錢幣大辭典) - Chinese Charms (壓勝錢編), January, 2013. 995 pages. (in Mandarin Chinese).
