= Buddhist coin charm =

Category of Asian numismatic charm

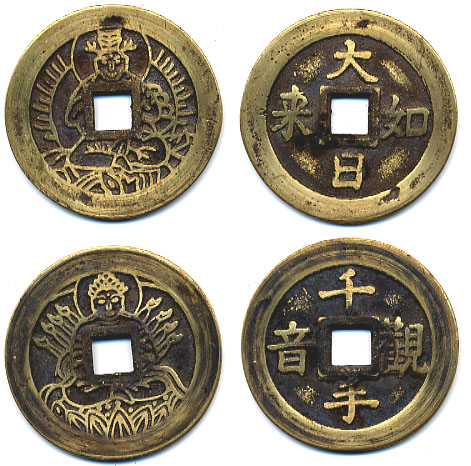
Japanese Buddhist numismatic charms depicting two different Bodhisattvas.

Buddhist coin charms are a category of Chinese, Japanese, Korean, and Vietnamese numismatic charms that depict Buddhist religious imagery or inscriptions. These coin charms often imitate the design of Chinese cash coins, but can exist in many different shapes and sizes. In these countries similar numismatic charms existed for Confucianism and Taoism, and at times Buddhist coin charms would also incorporate symbolism from these other religions.

== Chinese Buddhist coin charms ==
Chinese Buddhist numismatic charms (Traditional Chinese: 佛教品壓勝錢; Simplified Chinese: 佛教品压胜钱; Pinyin: fó jiào pǐn yā shēng qián) are Chinese numismatic charms that display Buddhist symbols of mostly Mahayana Buddhism. These charms can have inscriptions in both Chinese and Sanskrit (while those with Sanskrit inscriptions did not appear until the Ming dynasty), these charms generally contain blessings from the Amitābha Buddha such as coins with the inscription ē mí tuó fó (阿彌陀佛).

Temple coins often had inscriptions calling for compassion and requesting for the Buddha to protect the holder of the coin. Most temple coins are small. Some of them contain mantras from the Heart Sūtra. Some Buddhist charms are pendants dedicated to the Bodhisattva Guanyin. Common symbols are the lotus which is associated with the Buddha, and the banana which is associated with Vanavasa. Less commonly, some Buddhist charms also contain Taoist symbolism including Taoist "magic writing" script. There are Buddhist charms based on the Ming dynasty era hóng wǔ tōng bǎo (洪武通寶) but larger.

=== Hongwu Tongbao charms ===
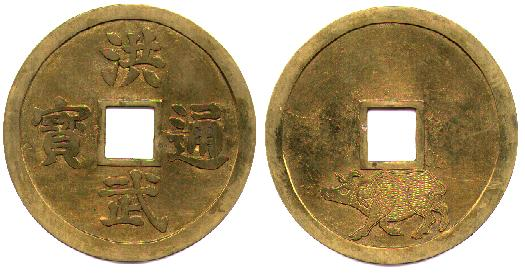
A Hongwu Tongbao (洪武通寶) charm or amulet which is 119 millimeters in diameter that depicts an ox (or bull) on its reverse alluding to the simple life of Zhu Yuanzhang before he became the Hongwu Emperor.

Chinese numismatic charms with the inscription "Hongwu Tongbao" (洪武通寶) are common however those with graphic depictions of the life of Zhu Yuanzhang only began to appear after the Xinhai revolution overthrew the Qing dynasty and established the Republic of China in 1912, this was because casting or having in one's possession a "coin" which showed the life of a Chinese emperor during the imperial period would lead to them facing almost certain death. However, as the threat of punishment for circulating these charms disappeared in 1912 they became more commonplace. The reason why Hongwu Tongbao charms and amulets became very popular with the Chinese masses is because these amulets represented the hope that those who come from less than fortunate beginnings may grow up to become the Emperor, this was because Zhu Yuanzhang was born to an impoverished peasant family, his parents died while he was very young, became a beggar, later found employment as a shepherd boy, and eventually moved to live in a Buddhist monastery. As he saw the injustices the Chinese people were suffering under the rule of the Yuan dynasty he joined the red turban rebellion and through his own ability managed to lead the rebellion and restore Chinese independence from foreign rule establishing the Ming dynasty with himself as its Emperor Taizu. This story inspired many commoners to believe that they and their offspring could amount to become successful despite their own humble beginnings, for this reason Chinese charms and amulets that carried the inscription "Hongwu Tongbao" became very popular and many of these usually depict either a part of or the entire aforementioned story.

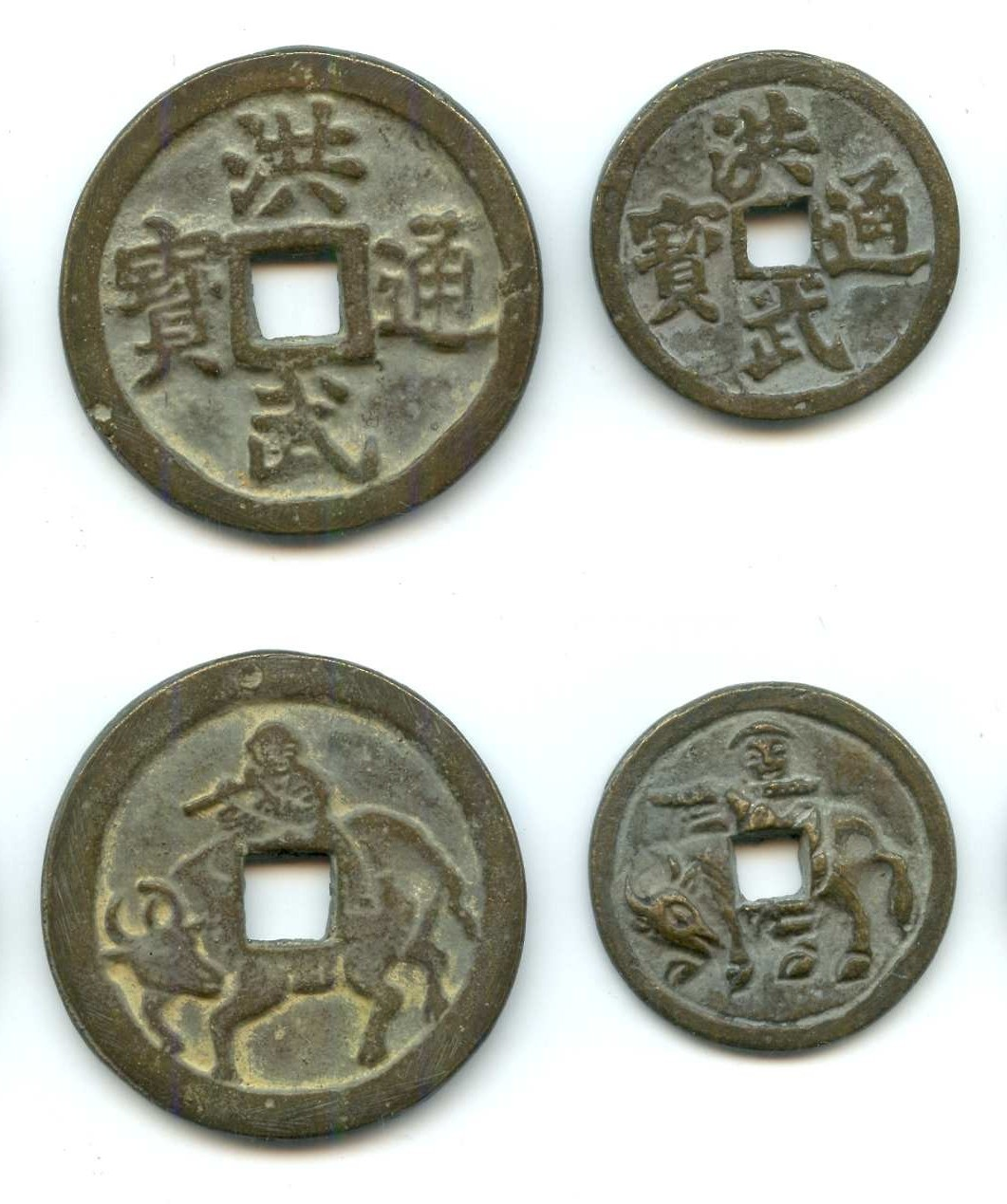
Hongwu Tongbao charms depicting a young boy playing the flute.

Usually these Hongwu Tongbao charms and amulets are a lot bigger than actual Hongwu Tongbao cash coins for example being 69 millimeters in diameter. However many of these charms and amulets need to be big because they depict very complex scenes of symbolism on their reverse sides. For example, a large Hongwu Tongbao charm may feature a lamb and an ox on its left side symbolising how Zhu Yuanzhang was born into a very poor family of peasants, a Buddhist monk seated on a lotus throne above the square center hole symbolising how he lived in a Buddhist monastery in his youth, next to this Buddhist monk are other Buddhist symbols such as "auspicious clouds" (祥雲) and a bodhi tree, which was the tree under which Gautama Buddha claimed to have found spiritual enlightenment. Another symbol included on this coin charm is a horse located right of the square center hole which symbolises the Mongols whose culture is strongly associated with the horse, the Mongol Yuan dynasty was overthrown by a rebellion of which Zhu Yuanzhang was a part. Another example of a Hongwu Tongbao charm with a size of 43 millimeters in diameter and weighs 29.2 grams depicts a less detailed scene where the reverse features a little boy playing a flute riding either an ox or a water buffalo, in this case the young boy represents Zhu Yuanzhang (or Emperor Taizu) in his youth while the flute he is playing is a symbol associated with a care free life while it's also both a Buddhist and a Taoist symbol. In Taoism the flute is associated with the immortal Lan Caihe while in Buddhism it's used in meditation which alludes to Zhu Yuanzhang's life in a Buddhist monastery. Meanwhile, not all larger Hongwu Tongbao charms feature more complex scenery as there is an example which only features an ox or water buffalo on the reverse alluding to the humble beginnings of the first Ming dynasty emperor.

=== Ming dynasty cloisonné charms ===
Ming dynasty cloisonné charms (Traditional Chinese: 明代景泰藍花錢; Simplified Chinese: 明代景泰蓝花钱; Pinyin: míng dài jǐng tài lán huā qián) are extremely scarce Chinese numismatic charms made from cloisonné rather than brass or bronze. A known cloisonné charm from the Ming dynasty has the inscription nā mó ē mí tuó fó (南無阿彌陀佛, "I put my trust in Amitābha Buddha"), with various coloured lotus blossoms between the Hanzi characters. Each colour represents something different while the white lotus symbolises the earth's womb from which everything is born and was the symbol of the Ming dynasty. Another known Ming dynasty era cloisonné charm has the inscription wàn lì nián zhì (萬歷年制, "Made during the [reign] of Wan Li") and the eight Buddhist treasure symbols impressed between the Hanzi characters. These treasure symbols are the umbrella, the conch shell, the flaming wheel, the endless knot, a pair of fish, the treasure vase, (Note: Also known as "the urn of wisdom".) the lotus, and the Victory Banner. Cloisonné charms produced after the Ming dynasty (particularly those from the Qing dynasty) often have flower patterns.

=== Chinese Buddhist charms with Sanskrit inscriptions ===
During the Ming dynasty Chinese numismatic charms with Sanskrit inscriptions began to appear. Due to the uncommon calligraphy of these charms it is not known if it reads A mi tuo fo or the six-syllable Sanskrit mantra "Om mani padme hum" (唵嘛呢叭咪吽).

== Japanese Buddhist coin charms ==
Japanese numismatic Buddhist charms are Buddhist charms often shaped like cash coins and bear inscriptions asking various figures from the Buddhist faith for blessings or protection, these inscriptions typically have a legend like "大佛鐮倉" ("(The) Great Buddha of Kamakura"). The Buddhist "且空藏棄" Japanese numismatic charm cast during the years 1736–1740 in Japan during the Tokugawa shogunate dedicated to the Ākāśagarbha Bodhisattva based on one of the favourite mantras of Kūkai is frequently found in China. Ākāśagarbha one of the 8 immortals who attempts to free people from the cycle of reincarnation with compassion. These coins were brought to China in large numbers by Japanese Buddhist monks, another Japanese Buddhist charm frequently found in China has the inscription "南無阿彌陀佛" ("I put my trust in (the) Amitābha Buddha").

=== Bodhidharma holding a Wu Zhu cash coin ===
There is a variant Daruma doll which features Bodhidharma, the founder of Zen Buddhism, holding a Northern Wei dynasty period Taihe Wuzhu (太和五銖, tài hé wǔ zhū) cash coin.

This numismatic variant of the Daruma doll features a number of differences from standard Daruma dolls, namely the fact that in this version Bodhidharma has visible fingers, this is because Daruma dolls typically don't have any limbs as according to a Japanese legend lost his limbs to atrophy after meditating in a cave for 9 years. The presence of the Taihe Wuzhu cash coin on this datums doll is akin to the Chinese proverb "one’s eyes grow round with delight at the sight of money" (traditional Chinese: 見錢眼開; simplified Chinese: 见钱眼开; pinyin: Jiàn qián yǎn kāi), an expression that was first recorded in the work Jin Ping Mei. This is because the doll depicts Bodhidharma firmly clutching the coin.

"Finally, we should not forget that Bodhidharma was a Buddhist monk who renounced the world, lived a very austere life in a cave, and spent a lifetime seeking true reality. Over the centuries, Daruma’s legacy in Japan has evolved to the point where dolls are made in his image to serve as good luck charms and coin banks. While the Japanese daruma dolls are very cute and symbolize perseverance, good luck and prosperity, the idea of associating the founder of Chan (Zen) Buddhism with something as secular and mundane as money is not consistent with his teachings."

— Gary Ashkenazy (加里·阿什凱納齊), Bodhidharma Holding a Wu Zhu Coin (Primaltrek – a journey through Chinese culture).

The presence of a Taihe Wuzhu cash coin in this amulet is historically accurate as Bodhidharma lived in the territory of the Northern Wei around the time that the coin circulated in the Northern Wei dynasty capital city of Louyang and its surrounding areas.

== Vietnamese Buddhist coin charms ==
Like with Chinese numismatic Buddhist charms there are Vietnamese numismatic Buddhist charms that contain Sanskrit inscriptions, however some of these Buddhist amulets from Vietnam contain only Sanskrit syllables associated with certain sounds but without meaning, these meaningless inscriptions were presumably borrowed from Chinese monks who used them as religious iconography.

=== Vietnamese amulets with pseudo-Sanskrit inscriptions ===
There are Vietnamese amulets that contain the Buddhist prayer "Om mani padme hum" (ॐ मणिपद्मे हूँ), or Án ma ni bát mê hồng (唵嘛呢叭咪吽), written in Devanagari script. This is chanting phrase used by Tibetan monks and has been adapted by other Buddhists in East Asia. In Buddhist schools of meditation the single syllable "Om" (ॐ) in this prayer is used as a focal point to help quiet the mind. These six syllables are said to purify the six realms. Many of these amulets have their inscriptions written in Devanagari is because many of the oldest Buddhist texts were written in Sanskrit later and Pali and many Chinese Buddhist monks studied Sanskrit to better understand these texts. Furthermore, Buddhist monks in Vietnam study Chinese languages to help understand these same texts. Thus there is a fusion of knowledge of both the Sanskrit and the Chinese language which influenced these amulets to both contain a form of pseudo-Devanagari and Chinese script.

== Buddhist symbolism on open-work charms ==
=== Fenghuang ===
Open-work charms depicting fenghuang are much less commonly seen than those that depict Chinese dragons. Fenghuang in Chinese mythology are symbols of "peace" and "joy", as fenghuang are seen as a symbol of yin they tend to have tail feathers in even numbers (as even numbers represent yin while odd numbers represent yang). Open-work charms that display fenghuang also tend to be on the larger side (for example 58 millimeters in diameter) and also being both thick and heavy. In Buddhism the fenghuang is considered to be a symbol of goodness because it eats no living thing, for this reason open-work charms depicting fenghuang were commonly worn by Buddhists.

=== Lotus ===
Open-work charms that feature the design of a lotus according to Buddhist tradition symbolise a detachment from worldly cares due to the manner the flower which is perceived to be beautiful to emerge from the pond's muck. Due to the fact that the lotus flower has two different names in Mandarin Chinese, namely "蓮花" (lián huā) and "荷花" (hé huā), the first character of the former can be used as a homophonic pun with the word "continuous" (連, lián) while the latter could be used to represent the word "harmony" (和, hé) creating a visual pun for "continuous harmony" (連和, lián hé).

Variants of these lotus charms that depict a lotus pod filled with seeds could also be worn in the hopes that they will improve fertility as the Mandarin Chinese word for "lotus seed" (蓮籽, lián zǐ) could be used as a metaphor for the "continuous birth of children" (連子, lián zi).

== Yuan dynasty era Buddhist temple coins ==
Gong Yang Qian (simplified Chinese: 供养钱; traditional Chinese: 供養錢; pinyin: gōng yǎng qián), variously translated as "temple coins" or "offering coins", were a type of alternative currency that resembled Chinese cash coins that circulated during the Mongol Yuan dynasty period. The Yuan dynasty emperors (or khagans) were supports of Buddhism, which meant that the Buddhist temples tended to receive official government support. During this period the larger Buddhist temples in China were able to cast bronze Buddha statues and make other religious artifacts which also meant that it was easy for them to also cast these special kind of cash coins which could then be used by faithful adherents of Buddhism as offerings to Buddha. In general, these temple coins tend to be much smaller and crudely made compared to earlier and later Chinese cash coins. However, because these temple coins, due to their copper content, still had intrinsic value, they would sometimes serve as an alternative currency in China, this would particularly happen during difficult economic times when the Jiaochao paper money issued by the Mongol government was no longer considered to be of any value.

== Zhouyuan Tongbao charms ==
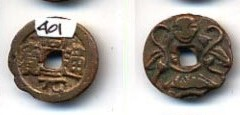
A Zhouyuan Tongbao charm (周元通寶花錢) depicting a Buddhist monk on its reverse.

Zhouyuan Tongbao (Traditional Chinese: 周元通寶; Vietnamese: Châu Nguyên Thông Bảo) charms are a common category of Chinese and Vietnamese Buddhist coin charms that are based on cash coins were issued by Emperor Shi Zong from the year 955 onwards. The pattern is also based on the Kai Yuan coin. They were cast from melted-down bronze statues from Buddhist temples. When reproached for this, the Emperor uttered a cryptic remark to the effect that the Buddha would not mind this sacrifice. It is said that the Emperor himself supervised the casting at the many large furnaces at the back of the palace. The coins have amuletic properties because they were made from Buddhist statues, and are particularly effective in midwifery – hence the many later-made imitations.

== List of Buddhist coin charm variants ==
List of Buddhist coin charm inscriptions and themes:

List of Buddhist coin charm inscriptions
| Transliteration | Traditional Chinese | Simplified Chinese | Literal English translation | Meaning | Image |
|---|---|---|---|---|---|
| A Mi Tuo Fo; Ci bei fang cun | 阿彌陀佛 慈悲方寸 | 阿弥陀佛 慈悲方寸 | "Amitābha Buddha" "Compassionate heart" | Amitābha Buddha | |
| A Mi Tuo Fo; Bo luo jie di | 阿彌陀佛 波羅揭諦 | 阿弥陀佛 波罗揭谛 | "Amitābha Buddha" "Gone beyond" | Amitābha Buddha; A part of the Heart Sūtra (Note: The reverse inscription on these Buddhist coin charms reads bo luo jie di (波羅揭諦, bō luó jiē dì) and is part of the mantra found at the very end of the Buddhist Heart Sūtra. A Buddhist mantra consists of words that are meant to be spoken aloud by a follower of the religion. The Chinese is actually a transliterated a version of the Tibetan pronunciation of this mantra on these old Yuan dynasty era temple coins because the Tibetan pronunciation is considered to more closely approximate the sound of the original Sanskrit mantra. The inscription is taken from this part of the mantra: 揭諦揭諦波羅揭諦, which is jie di jie di bo luo jie di in Mandarin Chinese and ga te ga te pa ra ga te in the original Sanskrit. The "pa ra ga te" (paragate) translates into the English language as "gone beyond", which in this religious context means in the progressive path to the perfection of spiritual wisdom and the attainment of spiritual enlightenment, it is necessary for one in order to attain this to have "gone beyond".) | |
| Nan Wu A Mi Tuo Fo | 南無阿彌陀佛 | 南无阿弥陀佛 | "To trust in the Amitābha Buddha" | To trust in the Amitābha Buddha (Note: The first two Hanzi characters "南無" (nan wu) of this Buddhist coin charm are in actuality a transliteration of the Sanskrit word namah which translates into the English language as "to trust in". When these two Chinese characters are used in this manner and in this specific context the Mandarin Chinese pronunciation should actually be na mo rather than nan wu. Making the full "南無阿彌陀佛" inscription into nā mó ē mí tuó fó.) | |
| Hongwu Tongbao | 洪武通寶 | 洪武通宝 | "Hongwu valid currency" | See above | |
| Qie kong zang qi | 且空藏棄 | 且空藏弃 | "Ākāśagarbha Bodhisattva" | Ākāśagarbha Bodhisattva (Note: "Qie kong zang qi" in this context refers to the Ākāśagarbha Bodhisattva known in Japan as Kokūzō Bosatsu (且空藏棄). In China, the Ākāśagarbha Bodhisattva (Buddha) is known by the name of "Xu kong zang fo" (虚空藏佛).) | |
| Cibei Fangcun | 慈悲方寸 | 慈悲方寸 | "Compassionate heart." | A reference to the Heart Sutra | |
| Tongxin Heyi | 同心合意 | 同心合意 | "Of one mind." | Inner peace. | |
| Shende Xin'an | 身德心安 | 身德心安 | "A virtuous character and peaceful mind." | Inner peace. | |
| Xin'an Shenjian | 心安身健 | 心安身健 | "Peaceful mind and healthy body." | Inner peace and good health. | |

== Sources ==
- Greenbaum, Craig (2006). "Amulets of Vietnam".
- Edgar J.Mandel. Metal Charms and Amulets of China.
- Great Dictionary of China Numismatics (中國錢幣大辭典) – Chinese Charms (壓勝錢編), January, 2013. 995 pages. (in Mandarin Chinese).
- Hartill, David (2005). Cast Chinese coins : a historical catalogue. Trafford, UK: Trafford Pub. ISBN 978-1412054669.
