= Washington nickel =

Pattern coin struck by the United States Mint

- United States
- Value: 5 cents (0.05 US dollars)
- Mass: 5.000 g (0.1615 troy oz)
- Diameter: 20.50 mm (0.8077 in)
- Edge: Plain
- Composition: Various
- Years of minting: 1866, 1909–1910

Obverse
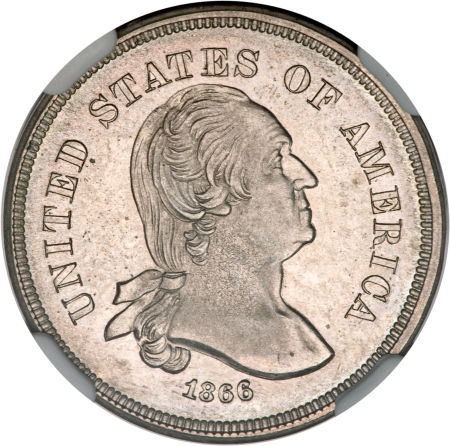
- Design: George Washington
- Designer: James B. Longacre
- Design date: 1866

Reverse
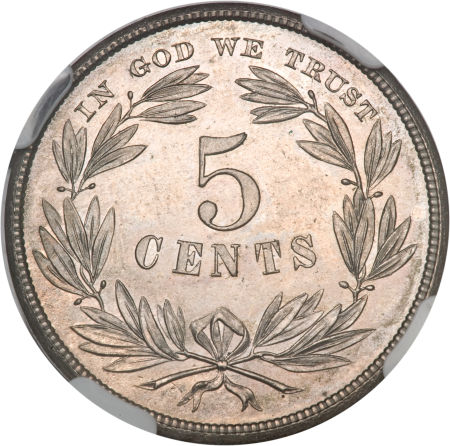
- Design: Denomination surrounded by wreath (shown), stars, or stars with rays
- Designer: James B. Longacre
- Design date: 1866
- Design discontinued: 1866

The Washington nickel is a pattern coin that was struck by the United States Mint in 1866 and again in 1909 and 1910.

== 1866 pieces ==
The Washington nickel was one of several proposed designs for the five-cent nickel coin, which was to replace the half dime as the five-cent coin of the United States. The obverse of the coin features a portrait of George Washington facing right. This design was not chosen for production, and the Shield nickel was produced instead, although some patterns of the Washington nickel utilized some of the reverse designs that were eventually adopted for the Shield nickel.

The 1866 Washington nickel is relatively common for a pattern coin, and is popular with coin collectors.

== 1909–10 pieces ==
In 1909 the US Mint once again struck nickel patterns with Washington's portrait. The coin was produced in two major varieties, one with Washington facing right and one facing left. Only seven pieces are known to exist, all of which are in the National Numismatic Collection at the Smithsonian Institution.

Two coins with Washington facing left were struck in 1910. These, like the 1909 pieces, are at the Smithsonian.

== Obverse designs ==
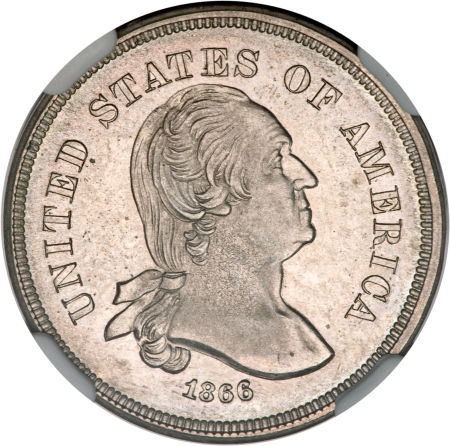
1866 obverse, Washington surrounded by "United States of America"

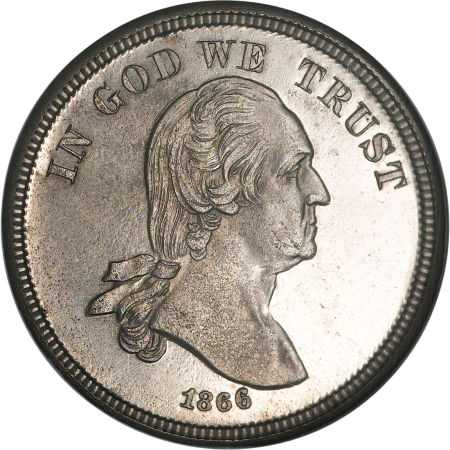
1866 obverse, Washington with motto "In God We Trust"

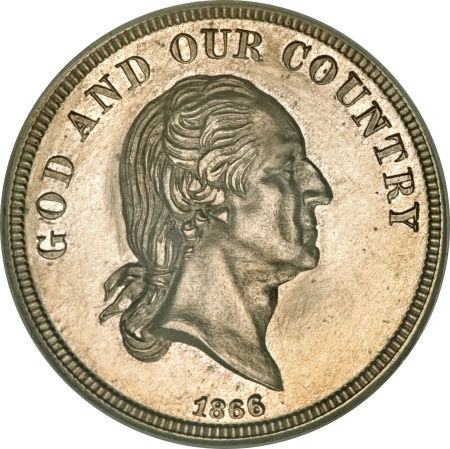
1866 obverse, Washington with motto "God and Our Country"

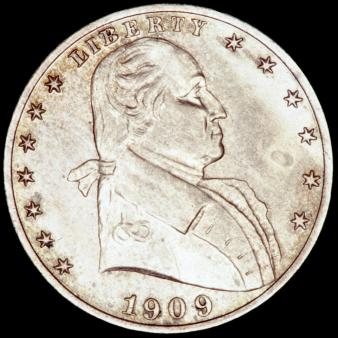
1909 obverse, large date with Washington facing right and "Liberty" surrounded by 7 stars to the left and 6 stars to the right

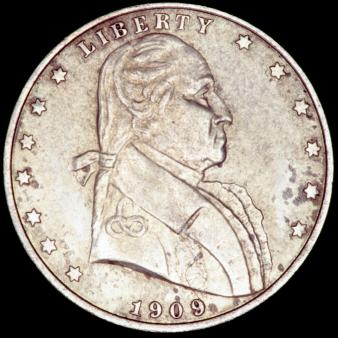
1909 obverse, small date with Washington facing right and "Liberty" surrounded by 7 stars to the left and 6 stars to the right

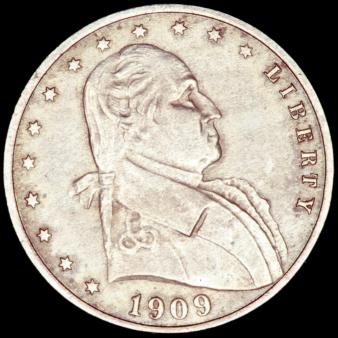
1909 obverse, with Washington facing right and "Liberty" following 13 stars

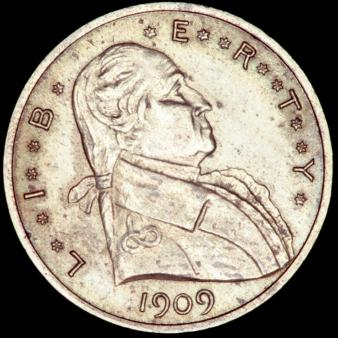
1909 obverse, with Washington facing right and two stars between each letter in "Liberty"

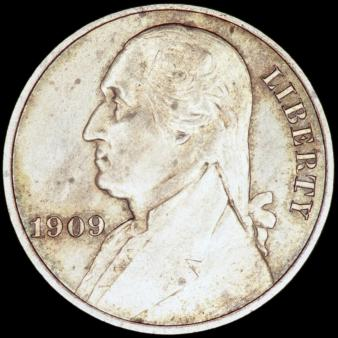
1909 obverse, with Washington facing left and small "9"s in the date

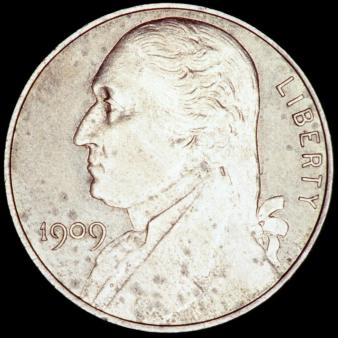
1909 obverse, with a slightly enlarged portrait Washington facing left and large "9"s in the date

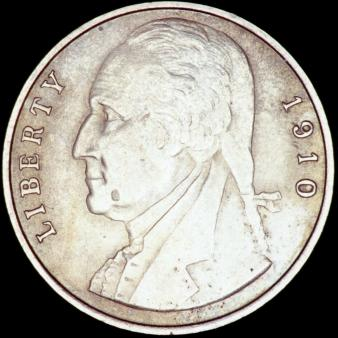
1910 obverse, Washington facing left

== Reverse designs ==
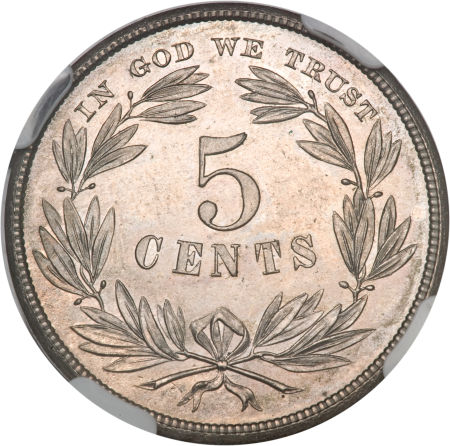
1866 reverse, "5 Cents" surrounded by wreath

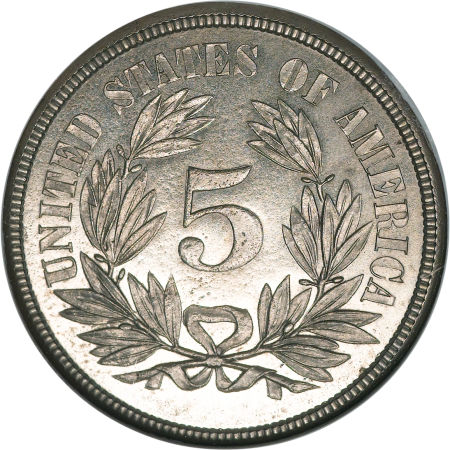
1866 reverse, "Short 5" surrounded by wreath

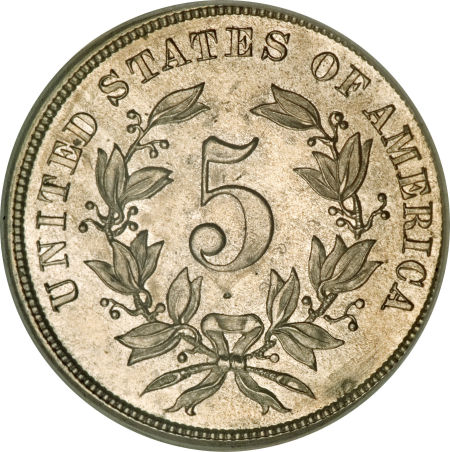
1866 reverse, "Large 5" surrounded by wreath

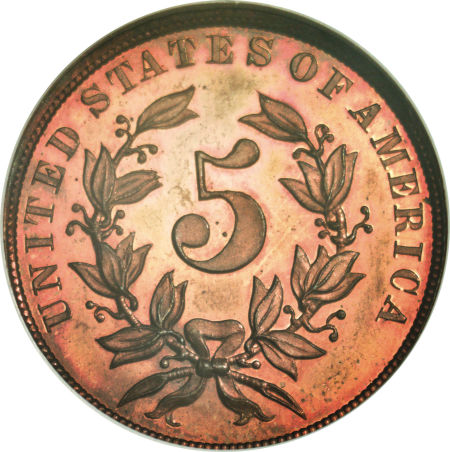
1866 reverse, "Dutch 5" surrounded by wreath

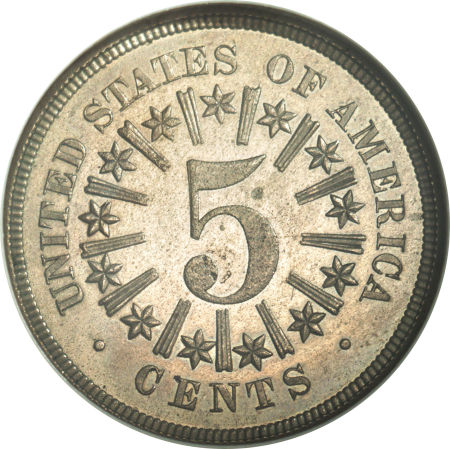
1866 reverse, Shield nickel reverse with rays

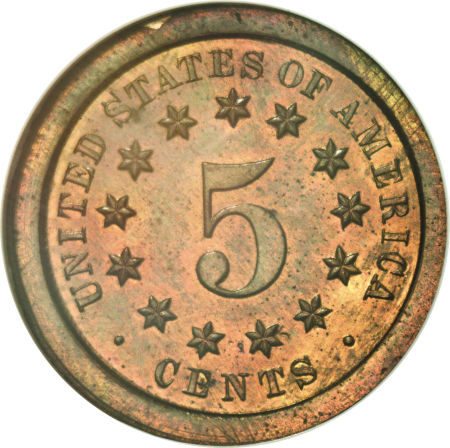
1866 reverse, Shield nickel reverse without rays

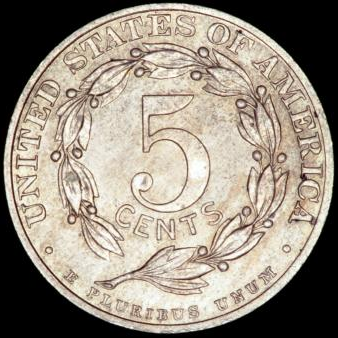
1909 reverse, CENTS under small 5

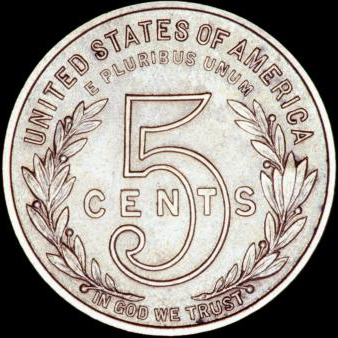
1909–1910 reverse, CENTS running across a large 5
