= William Barber (engraver) =

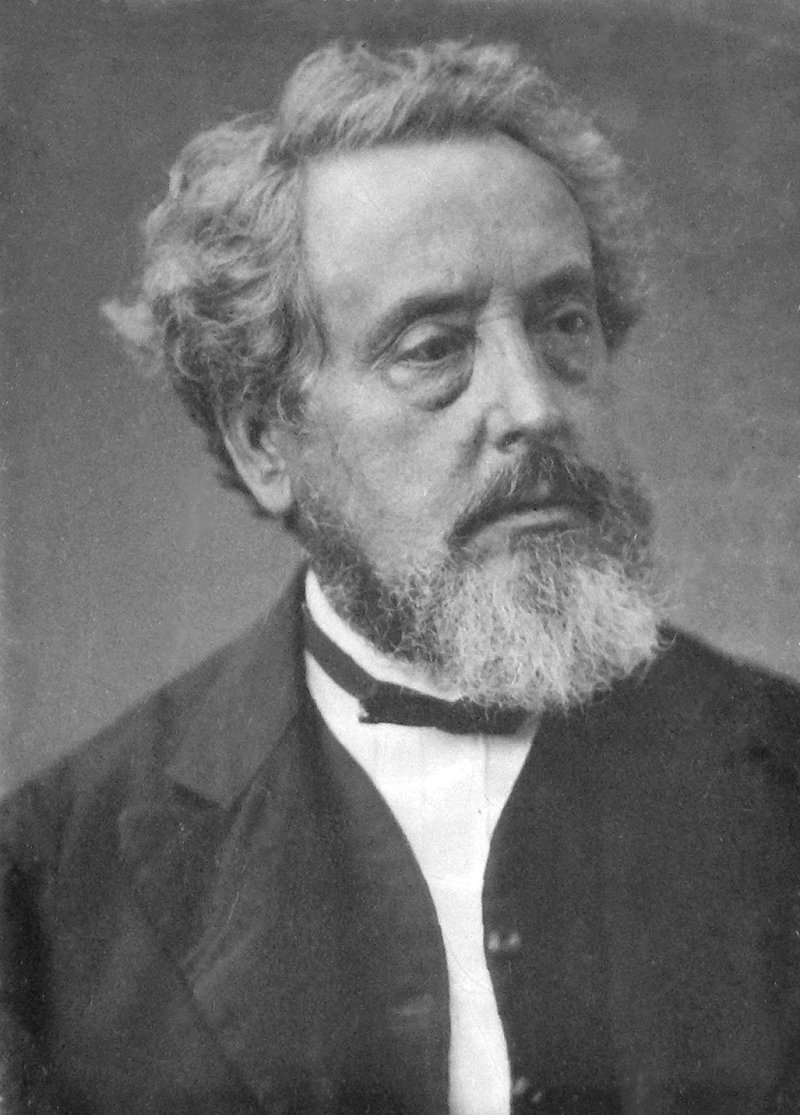
- Barber, 1875–1879

5th Chief Engraver of the U.S. Mint
- In office 1869–1879
- Appointed by: Andrew Johnson
- President: Ulysses S. Grant
- Preceded by: James B. Longacre
- Succeeded by: Charles E. Barber

Personal details
- Born: May 2, 1807 London, England
- Died: August 31, 1879 (aged 72) Philadelphia, Pennsylvania, US
- Resting place: Mt. Moriah Cemetery, Philadelphia, Section 104
- Spouse: Anna Maria (Anna May)
- Children: 4, including Charles
- Occupation: Engraver

William Barber (May 2, 1807 – August 31, 1879) was Chief Engraver of the United States Mint from 1869 until his death in 1879. He succeeded James B. Longacre in the position.

== Biography ==
Mr. Barber was born in London, England on May 2, 1807. He learned his profession from his father, John Barber, and was employed on silver plate work, after his emigration to the United States. He resided in Boston for 10 years and was variously employed in his line of work. His skill in this way came to the knowledge of Mr. Longacre, then Engraver of the Mint, and he secured his services as an assistant in 1865. On January 20, 1869, upon the death of Mr. Longacre, he was appointed by President Andrew Johnson as his successor, and continued in that position for the rest of his life. He fell ill in Atlantic City in the second half of August, 1879, and died at home on Ellsworth Street in Philadelphia on August 31. Besides much original work on pattern coins, he also produced over 40 medals, public and private, the work on all of them very creditable.

Barber is best known for his "Britannia"-inspired Trade dollar design, which was produced from 1873–1878 for circulation in the Far East, and in proof-only form thereafter until 1883. (The 1884 and 1885 Trade dollars were clandestinely made at the mint and are not actually part of the series. They are ultra-rarities, with ten and five coined, respectively, and despite their dubious origin, are highly valued)

When preparations were made to create a new denomination, the double dime (twenty-cent piece), William Barber and Philadelphia Mint Superintendent James Pollock knew that the design needed to be significantly different from the Liberty Seated design used on the quarter dollar. Barber designed a series of patterns that were designed to do just that, including the so-called "Sailor Head" and "Liberty at the Seashore" designs. He also created two different wreath designs and one shield design for the reverse. However, Mint Director H.R. Linderman mandated that Barber instead use the Liberty Seated design with an eagle on the reverse, thus dooming the coin to failure. The double dime saw circulation only in 1875 and 1876, with proofs struck in 1877 and 1878.

William Barber designed and engraved a number of medals. Among them are the 1869 "broken column" medalet (mini medal) remembering Lincoln's assassination, the popular 1869 Pacific Railroad medal, the even more popular 1876 Centennial medal, and the second Ulysses S. Grant Inaugural medal. What most people don't know is that William Barber designed what would have been the first U.S. commemorative coin, had it ever been made. Original sketches of a Liberty head quarter dollar were to commemorate the beginning of the nation's second century. Unfortunately, the beautiful design didn't overcome lack of interest in the idea for the coin, and it never made it to the pattern stage.

Barber was also a pattern designer, and for a time engaged in a "pattern war" with fellow coin designer and future Chief Engraver George T. Morgan. There were numerous pattern designs for "Standard" coinage soon after he became the Chief Engraver. The only part of this idea that became reality was a standardized "Commercial" dollar which eventually became the Trade dollar. The high watermark of his pattern work was the so-called "Amazonian" pattern coinage of 1872. Made for both silver and gold denominations, today they are some of the most prized and valuable of collectible patterns.

In 1876, following the failure of the double dime, tension developed between William Barber and the Mint Director. Linderman wanted some new blood in the Engraving department. It isn't known whether this was a result of the debacle of the twenty-cent piece or if Linderman simply wanted new talent. Regardless of the reason, Linderman hired George T. Morgan from England for the Engraving Department. However, he did this rather behind the back of the Chief Engraver. To make matters worse, when Morgan arrived in Philadelphia, Linderman specified the new arrival would report to himself in Washington, not to the Chief Engraver as was the normal practice. This management decision by Linderman resulted in difficulties of Morgan fitting in with William Barber, the Engraving department, and Mint Superintendent James Pollock. While there was an uneasy relationship between William Barber and George Morgan, the main hostility was between Barber and Linderman.

Following Linderman's retirement in 1878, things returned to a normal existence, and Morgan began reporting into the Chief Engraver, and began a close working relationship with Assistant Engraver Charles Barber. At the time of his death, William Barber was highly thought of by his colleagues at the Mint. On September 2, 1879, two days after his death, a special meeting of the staff was held at the mint to discuss the life and passing of William Barber. A record of this meeting is found in a touching 2-page memo that summarizes the meeting and was presented to the family. It includes the passages,

Whereas, by the sovereign will of God, Mr. William Barber, Engraver of the Mint, has been removed by death, and we, the Officers, Clerks, and Workmen, have met to express our sentiments and sympathy on this sad and solemn occasion.

Resolved, that in parting with him, we lose the co- operation of an affable, active, pain-staking, and meritorious officer, skilful [sic] in one of the most difficult of all arts; and evincing progress and improvement continually;

Resolved, that we sympathize with his family in their bereavement, and present them with a copy of these proceedings, signed by the Officers of the meeting.

and it is signed by Superintendent A. Loudon Snowden, Assayer William E. DuBois, Melter & Refiner James E. Booth, and Coiner O.C. Bosbyshell,

Following William's death, several of the assistant engravers wanted the top job, including Charles Barber, George Morgan, and others. After a number of months of deliberation, President Rutherford B. Hayes made the decision, and Charles Barber succeeded his father as Chief Engraver on January 20, 1880.

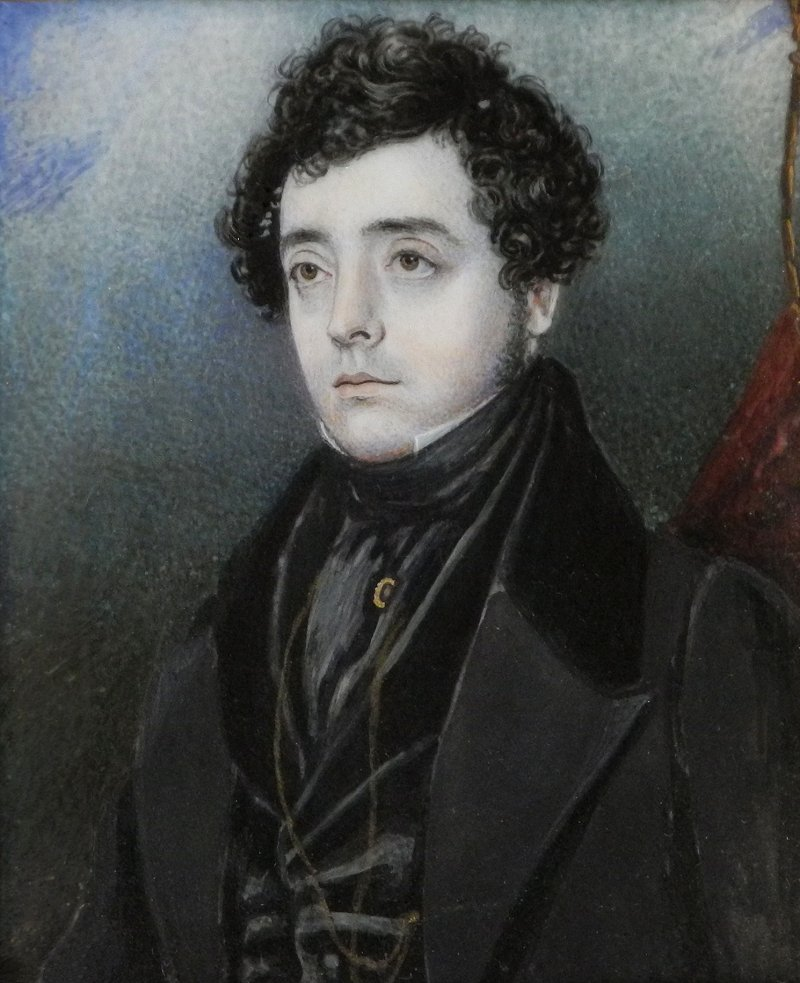
Painting of William Barber, c. 1840s

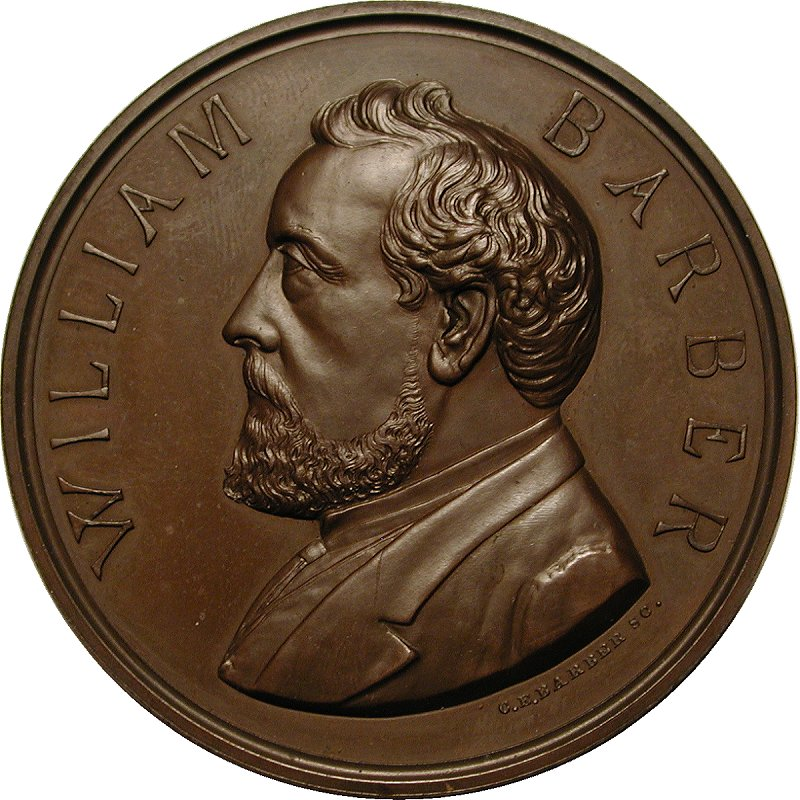
U.S. Mint medal, Chief Engraver William Barber

== Personal ==
William married Anna Maria (Anna May) and had four children. Son Charles E. Barber is well known. William and Anna May also had another son, named Harry, apparently younger than Charles. They also had two daughters, Florence (died July 1900) and Mary (died June 1913).

Anna May Barber died on October 28, 1880, a little more than a year after her husband. William and Anna May Barber, along with their two daughters, are buried in Mount Moriah Cemetery, on Cobbs Creek Parkway in Philadelphia. Until a painting of a young William Barber (c. 1840s) was found in the possession of the family, the only known image of William was on an 1880 medal commemorating the engraver, executed by his son, Charles.

In February 2019, the family discovered photographs of William and Anna Maria Barber (c. 1870s). On the back of the old wooden frame, in the handwriting of Edith Barber (Charles Barber's daughter, William's granddaughter), we learn who was in the pictures. This remarkable photo was announced at the Baltimore Expo.

== Coins Designed ==
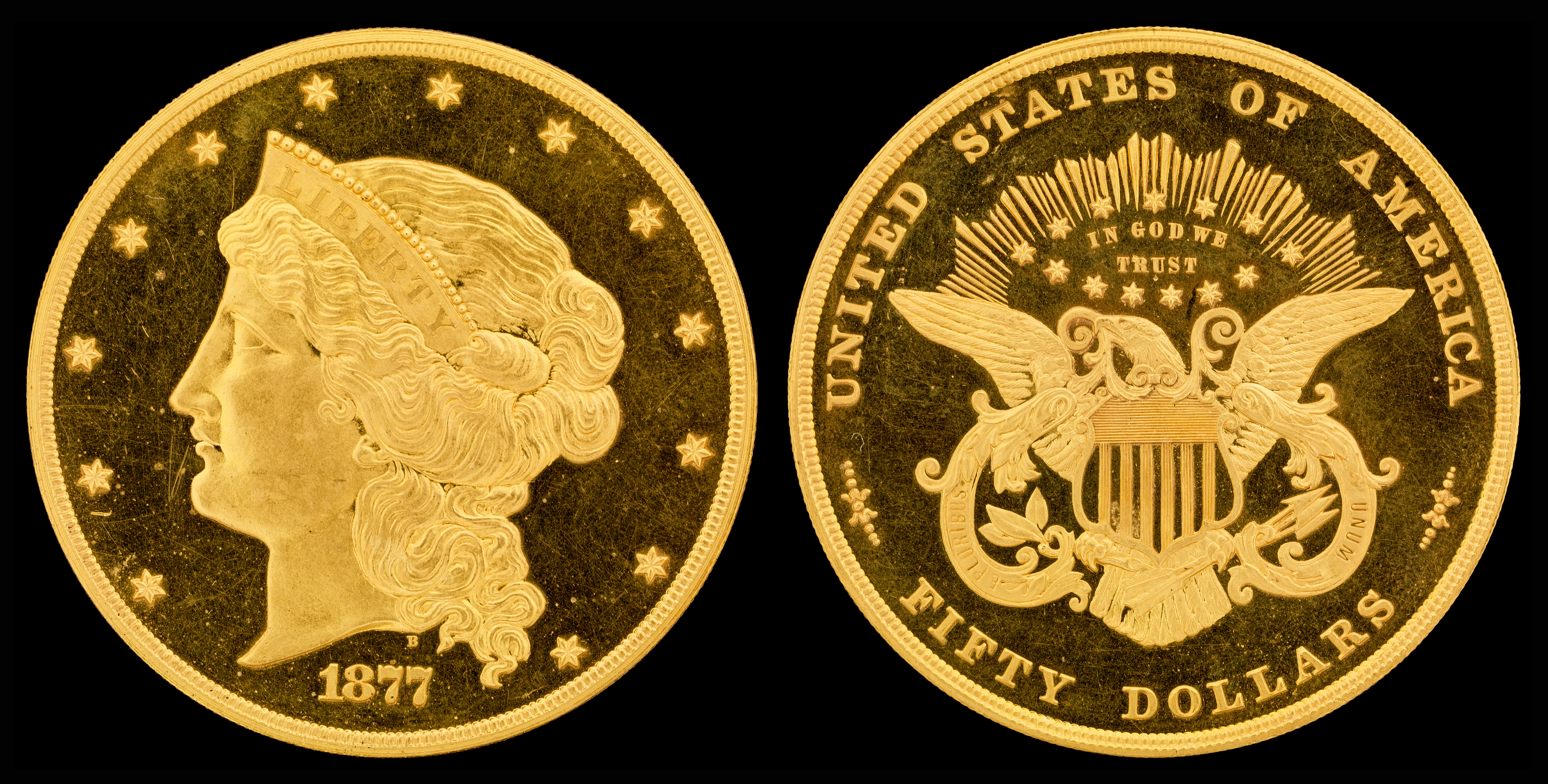
1877 $50 Half Union gold pattern (J-1546)

- Trade Dollar
- Double Dime (Twenty Cent Piece)
- Various patterns, including the 1877 Half-union, the "Sailor Head" and "Liberty at the Seashore" twenty-cent pieces, several 1877 half dollar patterns, an 1878 silver dollar, and the beautiful so-called "Amazonian" patterns of 1872

== Medals ==
- 1869 "Broken column" Lincoln medalet
- 1869 Transcontinental Railroad Medal ("Oceans united by railway")
- 1876 Centennial medal (for Philadelphia's United States International Exposition)
- 1878 Valley Forge Centennial medal - known as Musante GW-959 or HK-136
- 1879 Grant second inaugural medal

== Bibliography ==
- Cornelius Vermeule, Numismatic art in America : aesthetics of the United States coinage, Atlanta, Ga. : Whitman Pub., 2007.
- James B. Whisker, Pennsylvania workers in brass, copper and tin : 1681-1900, Lewiston, N.Y. : Edwin Mellen Press, 1993.

Government offices
Preceded by James B. Longacre	Chief Engraver of the U.S. Mint; 1869–1879	Succeeded by Charles E. Barber
