= Twenty-cent coin =

20 cents is a coinage value in some systems using decimal currencies. While some countries use a 20-cent coin, some countries use a 25-cent coin instead of a 20-cent coin.

Examples include:

- Australian twenty-cent coin
- Canadian twenty-cent coin
- Hong Kong twenty-cent coin
- Newfoundland twenty cents
- New Zealand twenty-cent coin
- 20 euro cent coin
- Twenty-cent piece (United States)

== See also ==
- Cent (currency)
- Cent (disambiguation)
- Category:Twenty-cent coins
- God Gave Me Twenty Cents, a 1926 American silent film
- 20P (disambiguation)
