= James B. Longacre =

American portraitist and engraver (1794–1869)

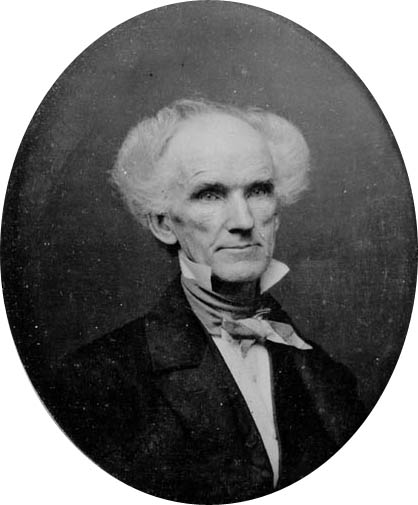
- 1855 portrait

4th Chief Engraver of the United States Mint
- In office September 16, 1844 – January 1, 1869
- President: John Tyler; James K. Polk; Zachary Taylor; Millard Fillmore; Franklin Pierce; James Buchanan; Abraham Lincoln; Andrew Johnson
- Mint Director: Robert M. Patterson (1844–1852); George N. Eckert (1852–1853); Thomas M. Pettit (1853); James Ross Snowden (1853–1861); James Pollock (1861–1866); William Millward (1866–1867); Henry Linderman (1867–1869)
- Preceded by: Christian Gobrecht
- Succeeded by: William Barber

Personal details
- Born: James Barton Longacre; August 11, 1794 Delaware County, Pennsylvania, U.S.
- Died: January 1, 1869 (aged 74) Philadelphia, Pennsylvania, U.S.
- Resting place: Woodlands Cemetery, Philadelphia
- Spouse: Elizabeth Stiles (m. 1827; died 1850)
- Children: 5
- Profession: Portraitist; engraver

James Barton Longacre (August 11, 1794 – January 1, 1869) was an American portraitist and engraver, and the fourth chief engraver of the United States Mint from 1844 until his death. Longacre is best known for designing the Indian Head cent, which entered commerce in 1859, and for the designs of the Shield nickel, Flying Eagle cent and other coins of the mid-19th century.

Longacre was born in Delaware County, Pennsylvania, in 1794. He ran away to Philadelphia at age 12, where he became an apprentice in a bookstore. His artistic talent developed and he was released to apprentice in an engraving firm. He struck out on his own in 1819, making a name providing illustrations for popular biographical books. He portrayed the leading men of his day; support from some of them, such as South Carolina Senator John C. Calhoun, led to his appointment as chief engraver after the death of Christian Gobrecht in 1844.

In Longacre's first years as a chief engraver, the Philadelphia Mint was dominated by Mint Director Robert M. Patterson and Chief Coiner Franklin Peale. Conflict between Longacre and the two men developed after Congress ordered a new gold dollar and double eagle, with both to be designed by Longacre. Peale and Patterson nearly had Longacre fired, but the chief engraver was able to convince Treasury Secretary William M. Meredith that he should be retained. Both Patterson and Peale left the Mint in the early 1850s, ending the conflict.

In 1856, Longacre designed the Flying Eagle cent. When that design proved difficult to strike, Longacre was responsible for the replacement, the Indian Head cent, issued beginning in 1859. Other coins designed by Longacre include the silver and nickel three-cent pieces, the Shield nickel, the pattern Washington nickel, and the two-cent piece. In 1866–1867, he redesigned the coins of Chile. Longacre died suddenly on New Year's Day 1869; he was succeeded by William Barber. Longacre's coins are generally well-regarded today, although they have been criticized for lack of artistic advancement.

== Early life; private sector career ==
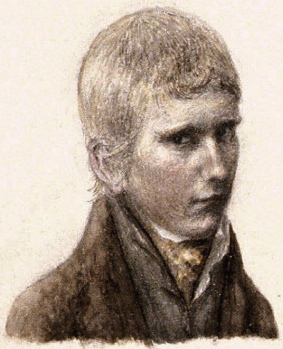
James Longacre, self-portrait at about age 12

James Barton Longacre was born on a farm in Delaware County, Pennsylvania, on August 11, 1794. His mother Sarah (Barton) Longacre died early in his life; his father, Peter Longacre, was the descendant of early Swedish settlers of North America. When Peter Longacre remarried, his son found the home life intolerable, and James Longacre left home at the age of 12, seeking work in the nearby city of Philadelphia. He apprenticed himself at a bookstore; the owner, John E. Watson, took the boy into his family. Over the following years, Longacre worked in the bookstore, but Watson realized that the boy's skill was in portraiture. Watson granted Longacre a release from his apprenticeship in 1813 so that he could follow an artistic muse, but the two remained close, and Watson would often sell Longacre's works.

Longacre became apprenticed to George Murray, principal in the engraving firm Murray, Draper, Fairman & Co. at 47 Sansom Street in Philadelphia. This business derived from the firm established by the Philadelphia Mint's first chief engraver, Robert Scot. Longacre remained at the Murray firm until 1819; his major work there was portraits of George Washington, Thomas Jefferson, and John Hancock which were placed on a facsimile of the Declaration of Independence by publisher John Binns; the work cost Binns a total of $9,000 (equal to $189,293 today). Also employed at the Murray firm from 1816 was the man who would be Longacre's predecessor as chief engraver, Christian Gobrecht. Longacre's work at the company gave him a good reputation as an engraver skilled in rendering other artists' paintings as a printed engraving, and in 1819, he set up his own business at 230 Pine Street in Philadelphia.

Longacre's first important commission were plates for S.F. Bradford's Encyclopedia in 1820; an engraving of General Andrew Jackson by Longacre based on a portrait by Thomas Sully achieved wide sales. Longacre then agreed to engrave illustrations for Joseph and John Sanderson's Biographies of the Signers of the Declaration of Independence, published in nine volumes between 1820 and 1827. Although the venture was marked by criticism of the writing, sales were good enough that the project was completed. Numismatic writer Richard Snow suggests that the books sold on the strength of the quality of Longacre's illustrations. Longacre also completed a series of studies of actors in their roles in 1826 for The American Theater.

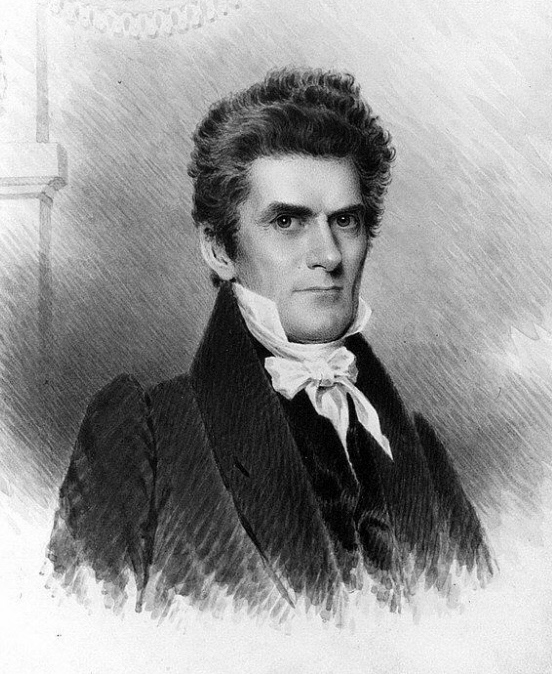
Senator John C. Calhoun, as rendered by Longacre in 1834

With lessons learned from the Sanderson series, Longacre proposed to issue his own set of biographies illustrated with plates of the subjects. He was on the point of launching this project, having invested $1,000 of his own money (equal to $32,250 today) in preparation, when he learned that James Herring of New York City was planning a similar series. In October 1831, he wrote to Herring, and the two men agreed to work together on The American Portrait Gallery (later called the National Portrait Gallery of Distinguished Americans), published in four volumes between 1834 and 1839. Herring was an artist, but much of the work of illustrating fell to Longacre, who traveled widely in the United States to sketch subjects from life. He again sketched Jackson, who was by now president, as well as former president James Madison, both in July 1833. He met many of the political leaders of the day, who were impressed by his portraits. Among these advocates was the former vice president, South Carolina Senator John C. Calhoun. In July 1832, Niles' Register described a Longacre engraving, "one of the finest specimens of American advancement in the art".

Longacre had married Eliza Stiles in 1827; between 1828, when their daughter Sarah was born, and 1840, they had three boys and two girls. Sales of the Gallery lagged due to the Panic of 1837; Longacre was forced to declare bankruptcy and travel through the southern and midwestern states, peddling his books from town to town, with his wife and elder daughter managing shipping and finances at home. Later in 1837, he was able to return to Philadelphia and open a banknote engraving firm with partners, Toppan, Draper, Longacre & Co. With great demand for engraving for notes being issued by state banks, the firm prospered, and had offices at 60 Walnut Street in Philadelphia and a branch at 1 Wall Street in New York. According to Snow, Longacre was known as the best engraver in the country.

=== Longacre engravings, 1819–1844 ===
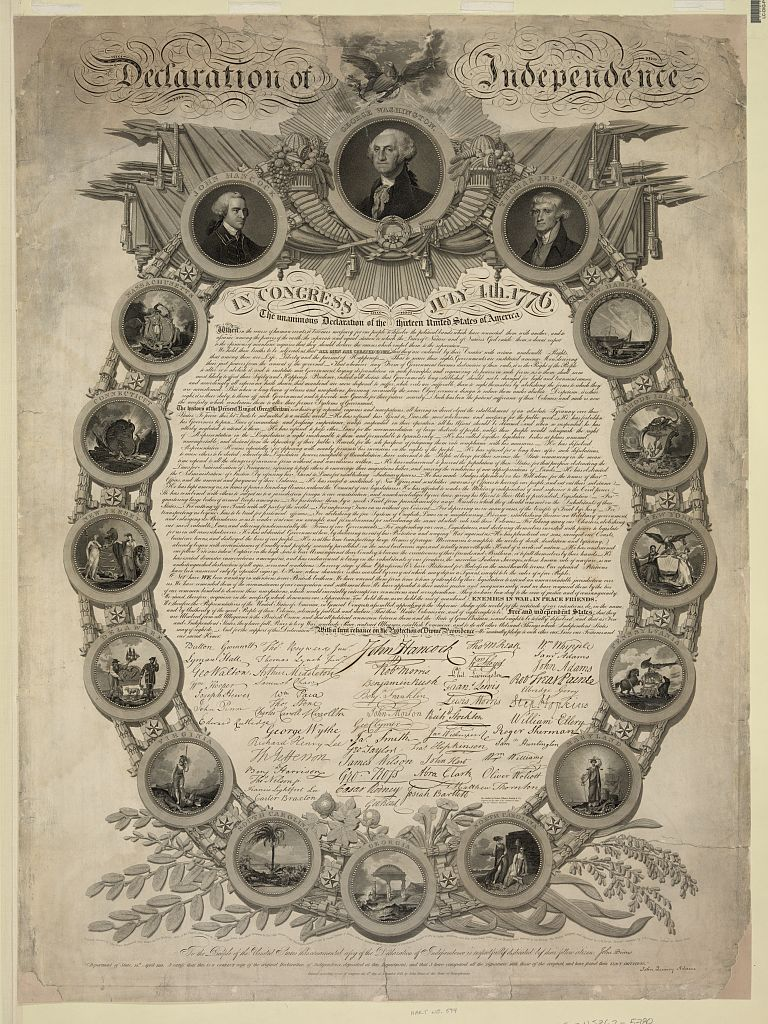
John Binns' version of the Declaration of Independence with portraits by Longacre, 1819

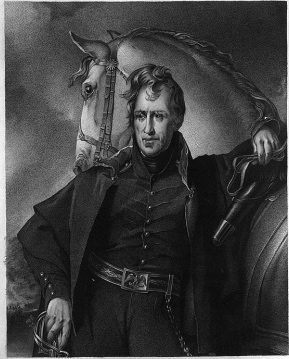
General Andrew Jackson, 1820 (after a painting by Thomas Sully)

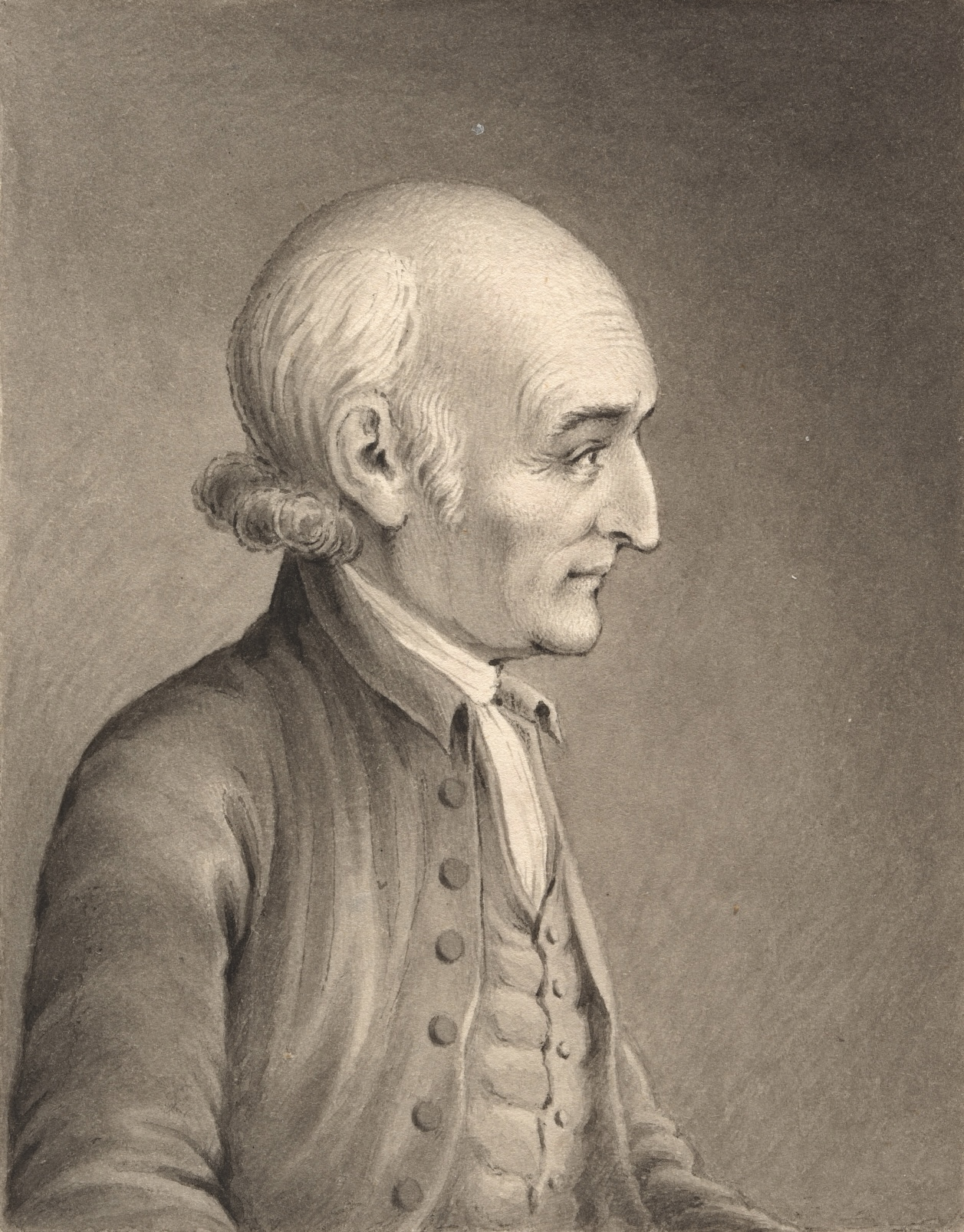
George Wythe, 1825 (after an engraving by William Satchwell Leney)

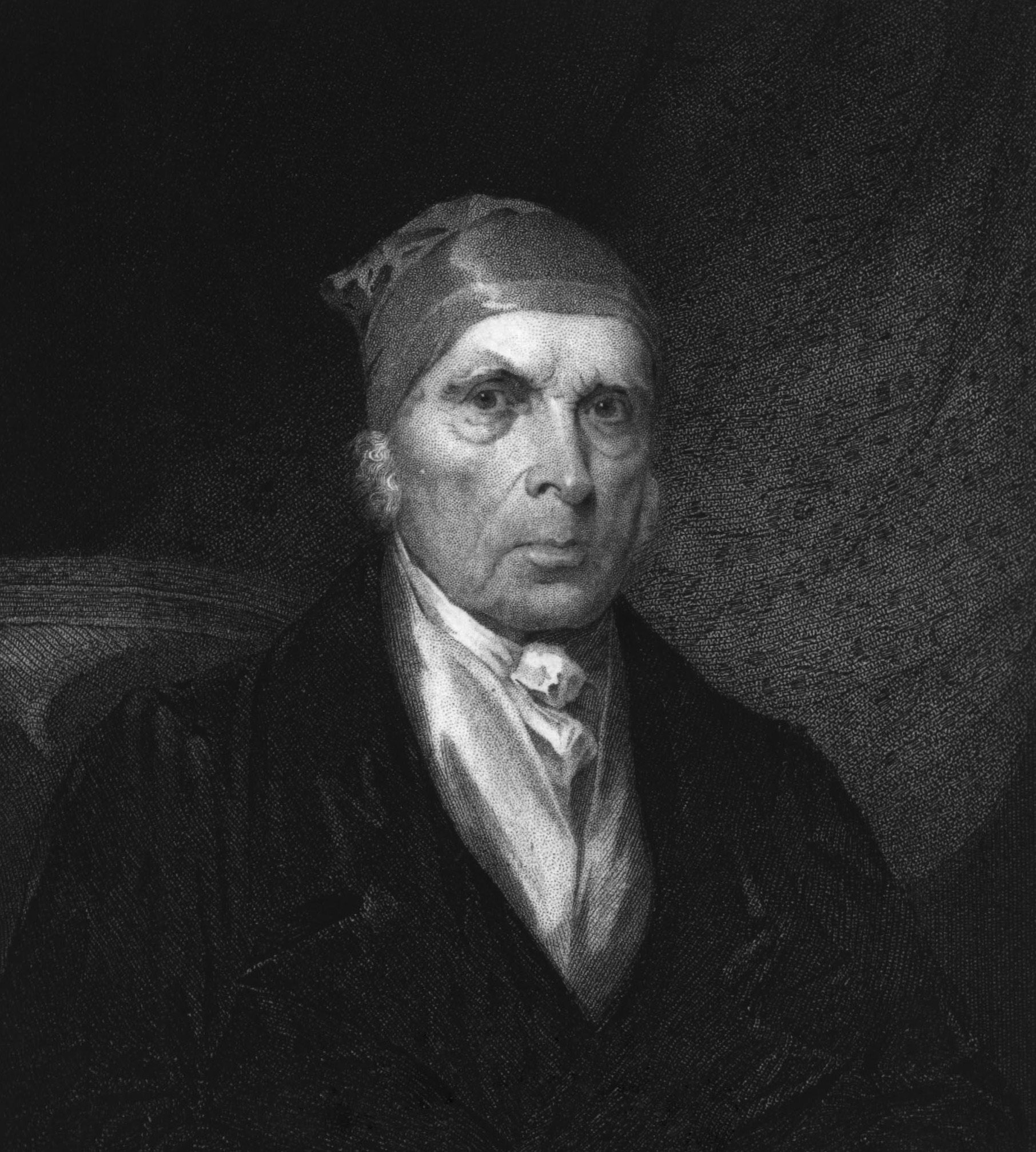
James Madison at age 82, 1833

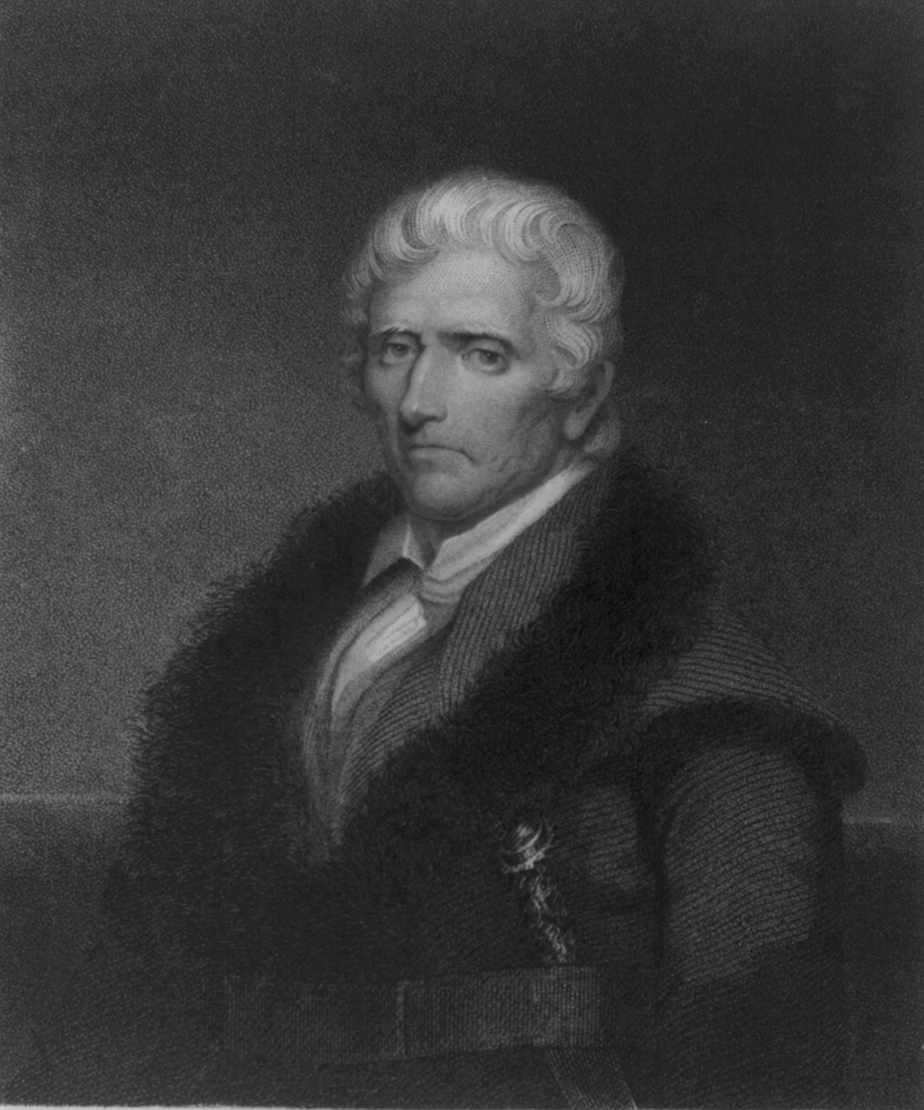
Daniel Boone, 1835 (after a painting by Chester Harding)

== Chief engraver (1844–1869) ==
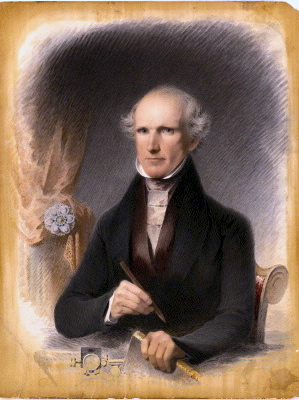
Self-portrait by Longacre (1845), watercolor on board

=== Appointment ===
Gobrecht's death in July 1844 left the United States Bureau of the Mint (the "Mint") without a chief engraver. Among those who hoped for appointment were Philadelphia banknote engraver Charles Welsh, and Allen Leonard, who had modeled the Mint's medal for former president John Quincy Adams. Through the influence of Senator Calhoun, however, Longacre secured the appointment. According to coin historian Don Taxay, Longacre did not attempt to gain the support of Mint Director Robert M. Patterson in seeking the appointment from President John Tyler, and "if Patterson resented the slight, however, he was more annoyed by Leonard's importunities."

Longacre was commissioned by President Tyler on September 16, 1844; his was a recess appointment as the post of chief engraver required Senate confirmation, and that body was not then sitting. Tyler transmitted Longacre's nomination to the Senate on December 17, 1844, which confirmed Longacre without recorded opposition on January 7, 1845. According to numismatist David Lange, Longacre was glad to get the position because engravers were receiving less work due to the advent of daguerreotype photography.

According to coin dealer and author Q. David Bowers, upon appointment as chief engraver, Longacre "found that he had entered a hornet's nest of intrigue, politics, and infighting, dominated by Franklin Peale, chief coiner since 1839". Peale sent Mint personnel to work on his private residence, and in addition to his official duties—mostly performed by his predecessor, Adam Eckfeldt, who continued in his work without pay despite his retirement—he had a thriving side business preparing dies for private medals using government resources. Peale controlled access to dies and materials, and was close to Director Patterson; the two men later proved to have been skimming metal from bullion deposits. The remaining Mint officers were cronies of Patterson, and Longacre found himself a loner among them. Walter Breen, in his comprehensive volume on U.S. coins, suggests that Patterson resented Longacre because of the engraver's sponsorship by Calhoun, whom the director disliked as a southerner.

=== Patterson and Peale years (1844–1853) ===
In Longacre's first years as chief engraver, no original designs were required for coins. Gobrecht had redesigned every denomination of U.S. coinage between 1835 and 1842, and his successor had time to learn arts necessary for coin production that he had not needed as a maker of print engravings. These arts included coin design, making of punches for design elements, and die sinking. Longacre's work in the private sector had involved cutting lines into a copper plate which was then used to print reproductions. Patterson wrote in August 1845 to Treasury Secretary Robert J. Walker that Longacre "is a gentleman of excellent character, highly regarded in this community, and has acquired some celebrity as an engraver of copper; but he is not a Die-Sinker. Indeed I do not know that he has ever made an attempt in this art." By December of that year, the Mint director had written to Walker in praise of Longacre, stating that the engraver had "more taste and judgment in making devices for an improved coinage here than have been exhibited by any of his predecessors. He has shown too that he is quite competent to make the required model from his drawings." Taxay attributed Patterson's lavish praise of Longacre to continued attempts by Leonard to gain the post of chief engraver.

A number of blunders can be seen among the early coins produced at the Mint under Longacre, though it is uncertain to whom these errors should be attributed. These include the 1844 half dollar struck at the New Orleans Mint (1844-O) with a doubled date, and the 1846 half dollar with the 6 overlying an identical digit, but one which had been placed horizontally. Bowers indicates that Longacre likely delegated such work, although in 1849 he wrote that his daily work was punching dates into working dies. Tom DeLorey, in his 2003 article on Longacre, notes that Peale and his staff often made punches without consulting the Engraver's Department (headed by Longacre), and believes the chief coiner more likely to be responsible.

Despite the charged atmosphere at the Philadelphia Mint, Longacre avoided conflict with Patterson and Peale until March 1849, when Congress authorized a gold dollar and double eagle or twenty-dollar gold piece, both new coins. By then, Patterson had come to desire Longacre's departure as he was deemed a threat to Peale's medal business, and opposed new coins which would require the chief engraver's skills. According to Richard Snow in his book on Flying Eagle and Indian Head cents, "having an ethical chief engraver threatened their sideline." The conflict came over the use of the Contamin portrait lathe, necessary in the making of dies both for Longacre in producing the new coins and Peale in his medal business. When Longacre complained that Peale was monopolizing the device, Peale decided to sabotage Longacre's coin work and have him removed from his position.

In early 1849, according to a letter written by Longacre the following year, the chief engraver was approached by a member of the Mint staff, warning him that another officer (plainly Peale) sought to have the engraving work done outside of the Mint, making Longacre redundant. The outside engraver in question was Frenchman Louis Bouvet, whom Patterson had prepare a design for the half eagle, though it was not adopted. Longacre's response to the information was to spend much of March 1849 preparing the dies for the gold dollar, at some cost to his health, as he later related. He demanded that Patterson hire assistance for him, but found the director willing only to have work contracted out. Longacre was unwilling to consent to this, as he could not supervise work done outside the Mint (he did get help within the Mint from assistant engraver Peter Filatreu Cross, who worked on the reverse of the gold dollar). Longacre proceeded with work on the double eagle through late 1849, and described the obstacles set in his path by Peale:

The plan of operation selected for me was to have an electrotype mould made from my model, in copper, to serve as a pattern for a cast in iron. The operations of the galvanic battery for this purpose were conducted in the apartments of the chief coiner. The galvanic process failed, my model was destroyed in the operation. I had, however, taken the precaution to make a cast in plaster ... From this cast, as the only alternative, I procurred [sic] a metallic one which, however, was not perfect; but I thought I should be able to correct the imperfections in the engraving of the die ... this was a laborious task, but seasonably completed, entirely by my own hand. The die then had to be hardened in the coining department; it unluckily split in the process.

When Longacre completed the double eagle dies, they were rejected by Peale, who stated that the design was engraved too deeply to fully impress the coin, and the pieces would not stack properly. Taxay, however, noted that the one surviving 1849 double eagle displays no such problems, and by appearance would be level in a stack. Peale complained to Patterson, who wrote to Treasury Secretary William M. Meredith asking for Longacre's removal on December 25, 1849, on the ground he could not make proper dies. Patterson that day promised the position to engraver Charles Cushing Wright, effective when Longacre was ousted. Meredith questioned whether a competent replacement could be found; Patterson assured him that one could. Longacre objected to Patterson that Peale was delaying acceptance of revised double eagle dies, the director did not reply in writing, but met with Longacre, told him the administration had decided to terminate him, and that he should send in his resignation without delay. Longacre, after thinking the matter over, did not do so, but instead went to Washington on February 12, 1850, to meet with Meredith. He found that the secretary had been lied to about a number of matters. According to Snow, Longacre did not seek retribution, content to be allowed to continue his work in peace. The double eagle went into production in March 1850, though Patterson complained that the coins did not strike well. The double eagle quickly became the favored way to hold gold, and in the years to come more gold would be struck into double eagles than into all other denominations combined.

Patterson wrote again to request Longacre's ouster on April 1, 1850, alleging that President Zachary Taylor had decided that Longacre be dismissed. Despite these attempts, Longacre remained in his position. Also in 1850, Longacre's wife Elizabeth (generally Eliza) died. The Mint officials clashed again in 1851, after Congress authorized a silver three-cent piece. Longacre prepared a design showing a star on one side and the Roman numeral III on the other, which initially won Patterson's approval. Peale, however, persuaded Patterson to change his mind and authorize the chief coiner to propose a version himself, copying design elements Gobrecht had used in 1836. The issue was submitted to the new Treasury Secretary, Thomas Corwin, who selected Longacre's proposal—Longacre had taken the precaution of sending the secretary a letter explaining his imagery.

In July 1851, Patterson retired and President Fillmore replaced him with Thomas Eckert. Peale's medal business suffered a setback when Adam Eckfeldt, who was still performing the duties of chief coiner, died in 1852. In 1854, Mint Director James Ross Snowden fired Peale after the extent to which he had used Mint labor for private gain became public. Nevertheless, the firing caused considerable press attention, a Senate investigation, and a large demand for compensation by Peale. With his enemies gone, life at the Mint improved for Longacre.

==== Early coins ====
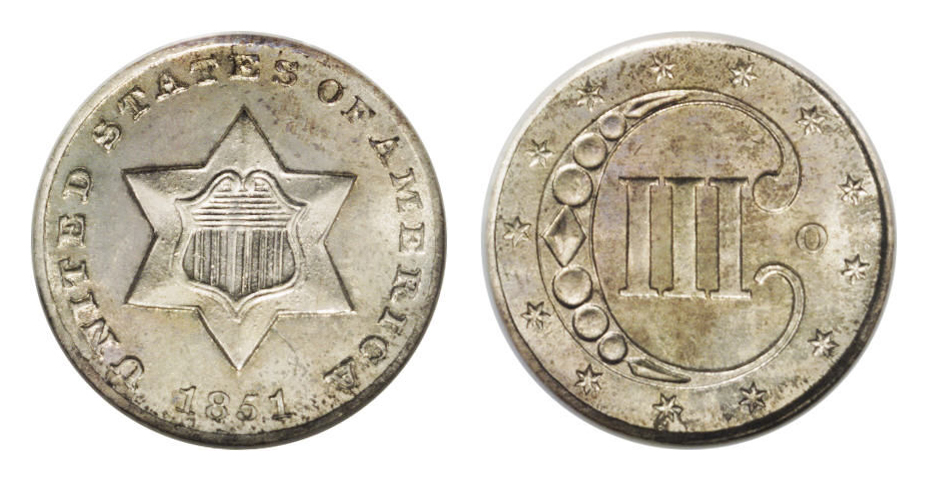
Silver three-cent piece (first struck 1851)

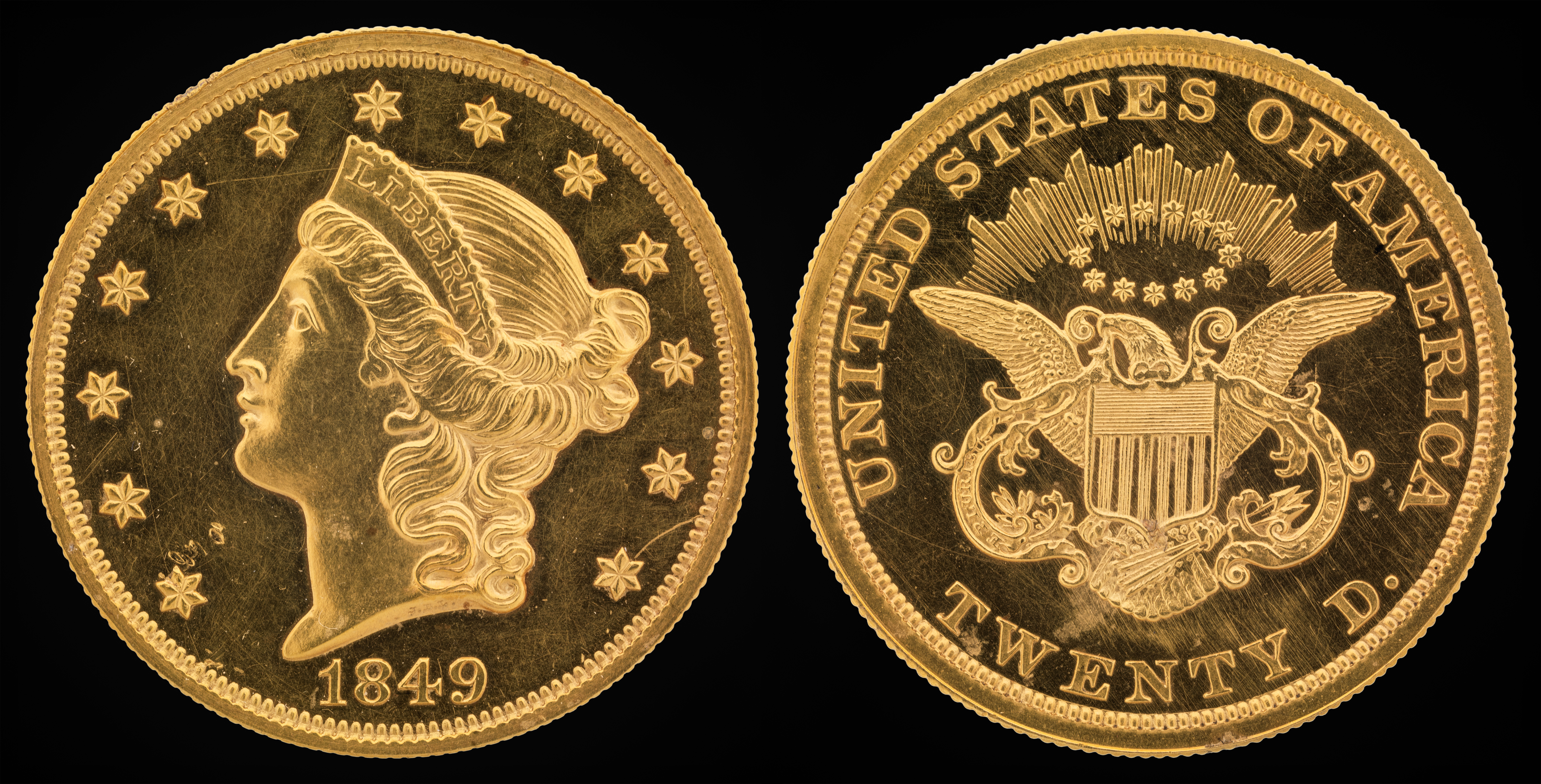
Longacre's 1849 double eagle (first year of issue and unique)

=== Prolific designer (1853–1863) ===
Faced with a rise in silver prices, Congress decreased the silver content of the half dime, dime, quarter and half dollar in 1853. Longacre was asked to alter Gobrecht's designs so new coins could be distinguished from old. He proposed placing rays around the heraldic eagle on the reverses of the quarter and half dollar, and arrows by the date for all of the affected denominations. As the act requiring the reduction in weight allowed the Mint to hire outside artists to do the work, Snowden allowed for public designs for the new pieces. No public entry was found suitable, and Longacre's proposal was adopted. The rays tended to shorten die life and were dropped within a year; the arrows were dispensed with after 1855.

In 1853, Congress authorized a three-dollar piece. In a note found among his papers, Longacre wrote that his task was to make the coin as easy as possible to distinguish from the quarter eagle, which at $2.50 was close in value. Longacre produced a design for a Native American princess, which he made different from Gobrecht's Liberty design on the quarter eagle with a thinner and wider planchet. At the time, a female Native American was often used to represent America in art, and a depiction of Liberty as an Indian princess was in accord with contemporary practices. The chief engraver wrote to Mint Director Snowden that the three-dollar piece, which went into production in 1854, was the first time he had been allowed artistic freedom in designing a coin. The gold dollar was altered the same year to make the planchet both thinner and wider; Longacre modified his princess design for the gold dollar. For the reverse of the coins, Longacre created a wreath of wheat, corn, tobacco, and cotton, blending the agricultural products of the North and the South. This wreath would also be used on the reverse of the Flying Eagle cent in 1856; reused on the dime beginning in 1860, the "cereal wreath" would be Longacre's last surviving design on coinage, remaining with modifications until the 1916 abandonment of the Barber dime.

In the mid-1850s, Longacre was engaged by the Navy Department to design a medal to be presented to Captain Duncan Ingraham. Longacre produced the imagery used for the reverse; the obverse was by Assistant Engraver Cross. Although Bowers describes Longacre as having been "strictly ethical in the duties of his office", when the Treasury Department learned that Longacre accepted a $2,200 payment from the Navy for his work, they required that he repay the money under a federal law barring compensation of this kind. Other than his design for the 1867 Assay Commission medal, and his similar, wreathed reverses for the commission medals in 1860, 1861, and 1868, the Ingraham work was Longacre's only medal made for the government.

After a rise in commodity prices, the Mint to sought to replace the large copper cent with a smaller version. Beginning in 1850, a number of pattern coins were struck in attempts to find a replacement coin. Designs and formats varied; at first, Mint authorities considered an annular, or holed, cent. In 1854 and 1855, much experimentation was done, some with a Liberty Head design as featured on the large cent; others with a flying eagle design adapted by Longacre from the Gobrecht dollar of 1836. Gobrecht's design said to have been modeled on Peter the eagle, a tame bird which frequented the Philadelphia Mint in the 1830s until it was caught up in machinery and killed; Peter, in stuffed form, was subsequently placed on exhibit at the Philadelphia Mint.

The flying eagle design was adopted for a large issue of experimental patterns given to government officials and others in 1856; that coin was then used for the regular issue from 1857. The reverse featured Longacre's cereal wreath, which led to difficulties in coining; the head and tail of the eagle on the obverse opposed the wreath, making those design points particularly hard to strike in the tough copper-nickel alloy which was used. Beginning in 1859, the cent featured a Longacre design of Liberty wearing a Native American headdress. What is called the "laurel wreath", though actually olive, adorned the reverse of the cent in 1859; beginning in 1860, a reverse with an oak wreath and shield was placed on the cent. The replacement of the wreath is for reasons unknown; the shield was added because of Snowden's desire to give the coin a "more national character". This reverse is generally credited to Longacre; Snow speculates that it may have been created by Assistant Engraver Anthony C. Paquet.

By numismatic legend, Longacre's Indian Head cent design was based on the features of his daughter Sarah. The tale runs that she was at the Philadelphia Mint one day when she tried on the headdress of one of a number of Native Americans who were visiting and her father sketched her. However, Sarah Longacre was 30 years old and married, not 12 as in the tale, in 1858 and Longacre himself stated that the face was based on a statue of Venus in Philadelphia on loan from the Vatican. James Longacre did often sketch his elder daughter, and there are resemblances between the depiction of Sarah Longacre and the various representations of Liberty on Longacre's coins of the 1850s. These tales were apparently extant at the time, as Snowden, in writing to Treasury Secretary Howell Cobb in November 1858, denied that the coin was based "on any human features in the Longacre family". Lee F. McKenzie, in his 1991 article on Longacre, notes that any artist can be influenced by many things, but calls the story "essentially false".

==== Mid-tenure designs ====
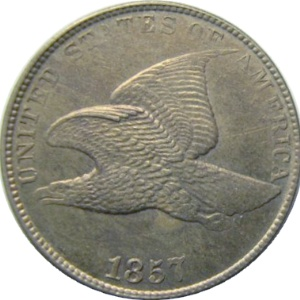
Flying Eagle cent (1856–1858)

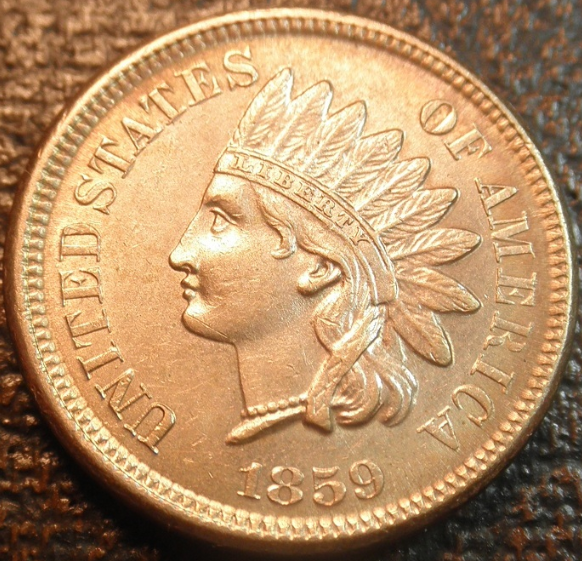
Longacre's Indian Head cent (struck 1859–1909)

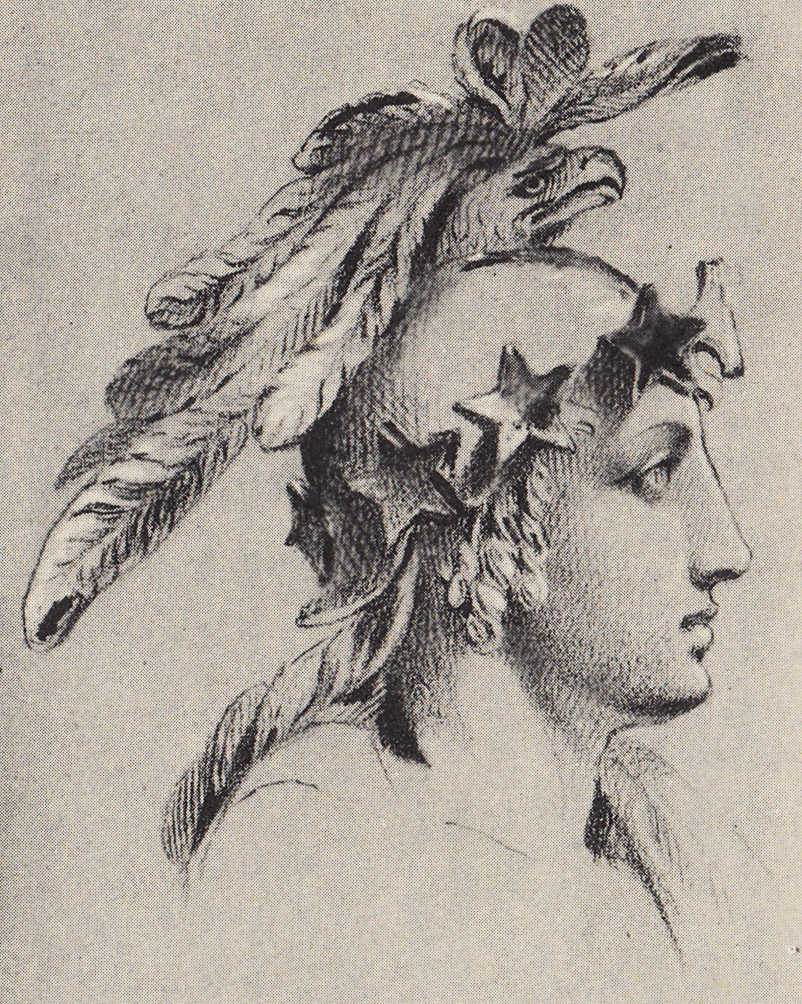
Sketch for the silver subsidiary coinage, 1859 (not adopted)

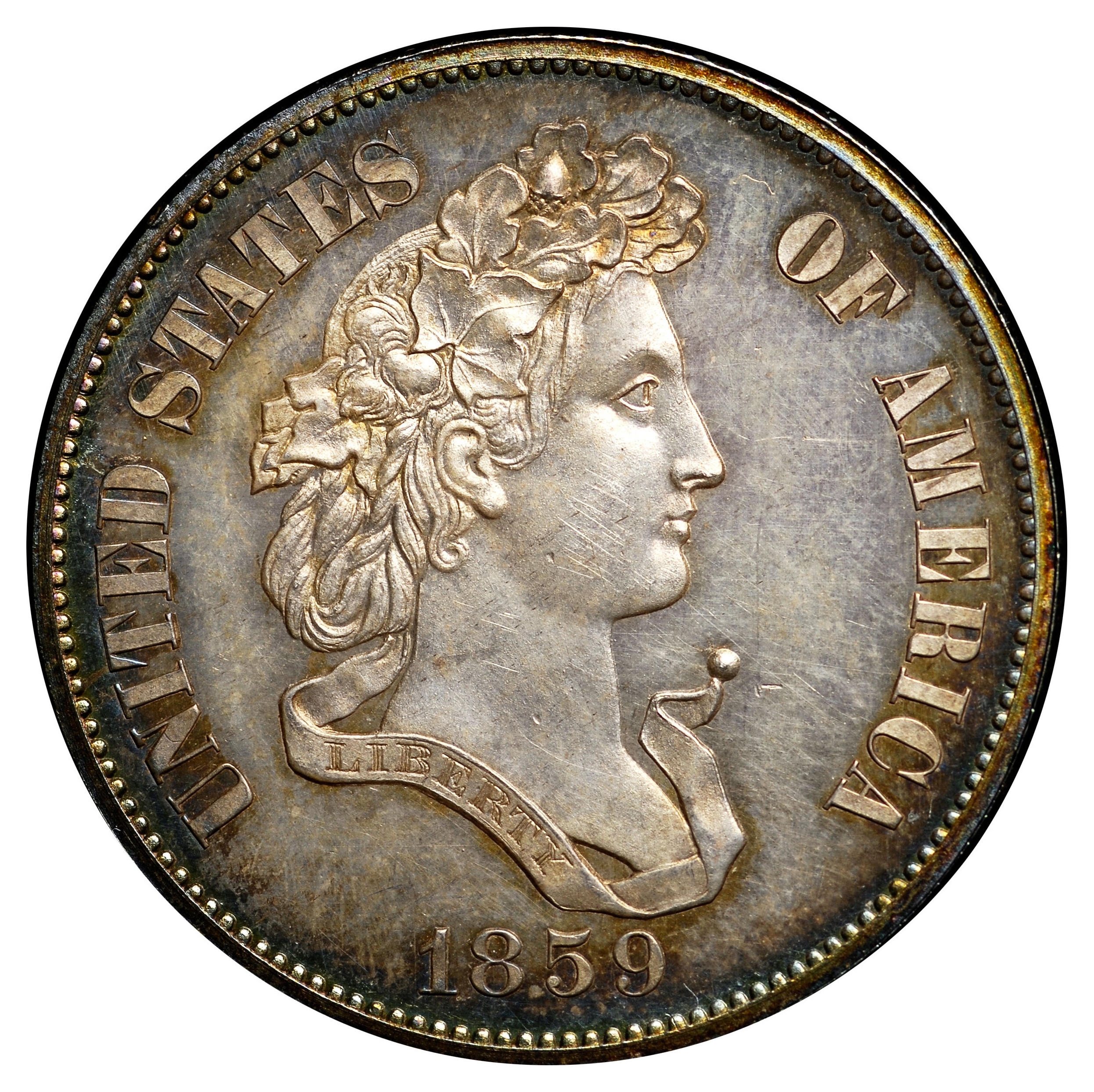
1859 pattern half dollar (not adopted)

=== Civil War issues and later career ===
The Civil War brought economic disturbances which resulted in the removal of some coins, including the base-metal cent, from circulation. Paper currency (valued as low as three cents), postage stamps, and private tokens, filled the gap. Many of the tokens were cent-sized, but thinner and made of bronze. Mint authorities took notice that these metal pieces were successfully circulating, and obtained legislation for a bronze cent. Longacre's Indian head design continued in its place with the new metal; later in 1864 he engraved his initial "L" in the headdress. The act which authorized the bronze cent also issued a two-cent piece; Longacre furnished a design, which Lange calls a "particularly attractive composition" with arrows and a laurel wreath flanking a shield. However, art historian Cornelius Vermeule stated that elements of the design "need only flanking cannon to be the consummate expressions of Civil War heraldry." Treasury Secretary Salmon P. Chase favored placing an expression of the nation's faith in God in a time of war on the coinage, and wrote to Mint Director Pollock, "You will cause a device to be prepared without unnecessary delay with a motto expressing in the fewest tersest terms possible this national recognition." Several mottos were considered by Pollock, including "God Our Trust" and "God and Our Country". Longacre's two-cent piece was the first coin inscribed with "In God We Trust".

Nickel had been removed from the cent over the objection of Pennsylvania industrialist Joseph Wharton, who had large interests in the metal; his congressman, Thaddeus Stevens, had fought against the act. In 1864, Wharton published a pamphlet arguing for a coinage in which all coins less than ten cents would be made of a copper-nickel alloy with 25% nickel, just over twice the percentage which the cent had contained. In March 1865, Congress passed legislation for a three-cent coin of that alloy, intended to retire fractional currency of that denomination. Longacre furnished a head of Liberty for the coin resembling his other depictions of the goddess which he had made in the past 16 years; for the reverse he used the "laurel" wreath from the 1859 cent surrounding the Roman numeral III borrowed from the silver three-cent piece.

Wharton and others seeking to promote the use of nickel remained powerful in Congress, and in 1866 secured authorization for a five-cent coin of copper nickel. Longacre prepared a number of designs; Pollock selected Longacre's design of a shield (similar to the two-cent piece) and a starry circle for the reverse, and the Shield nickel began to be struck that year. Mint Assayer William DuBois wrote to Longacre, "it is truly pleasing to see a man pass the life of three score and ten and yet be able to produce the same artistic works as in earlier days."

In 1865 Congress required the use of "In God We Trust" on all coins large enough to bear the inscription; in 1866, Longacre added the motto to all silver coins larger than the dime and all gold coins larger than the three-dollar piece. He also in 1867 made modifications to the design of the copper-nickel five-cent piece, or nickel as it was coming to be known. In 1865, Longacre engaged British-born engraver William Barber as assistant; William H. Key was also made an assistant in 1864 and remained at the Mint past Longacre's death.

Some of the coinage which had vanished from circulation during the Civil War and had been exported to South America continued to be used in Chilean trade as nationals found their local coinage valued poorly with the American pieces. In 1866, the Chilean government instructed its representative in Washington to approach the U.S. State Department for permission to have their coinage dies made in America. The Andrew Johnson administration was happy to oblige; Treasury Secretary Hugh McCulloch gave the Chileans a letter of introduction to Longacre in Philadelphia. Longacre was engaged by the Chileans to redesign five silver and four gold coins, and he agreed, so long as permission from McCulloch was obtained for him to accept an outside fee. McCulloch was initially agreeable, but Mint Director Pollock raised objection on the ground that government property should not be used to enable private gain. Eventually, all parties reached agreement that Longacre could do the work at a total cost of $10,000 provided that he brought in an outside engraver to do some of the work under Longacre's supervision; the chief engraver selected Anthony C. Paquet, one of his former assistants. Resistance at the Mint dissolved with Pollock's resignation over President Johnson's Reconstruction policies, and the dies and hubs (from which more dies could be made) were created beginning in November 1866, probably in-house at the Philadelphia Mint. Longacre's designs for Chile were used until new ones were adopted in the 1890s.

In 1867, Longacre proposed the use of aluminum in coins; this was rejected as the supply and price of the metal fluctuated considerably, and it then had a high intrinsic value. In 1868, Wharton's interests proposed making the dime into a copper-nickel piece and to modify the cent, three-cent piece, and nickel. The project was abandoned when it became clear the base-metal dime would be too large to be effectively struck in the tough copper-nickel alloy, but Longacre prepared a number of half dollar-size patterns. He also began work on re-engraving the designs of the gold pieces, and completed the $10 piece by year's end.

==== Later designs ====
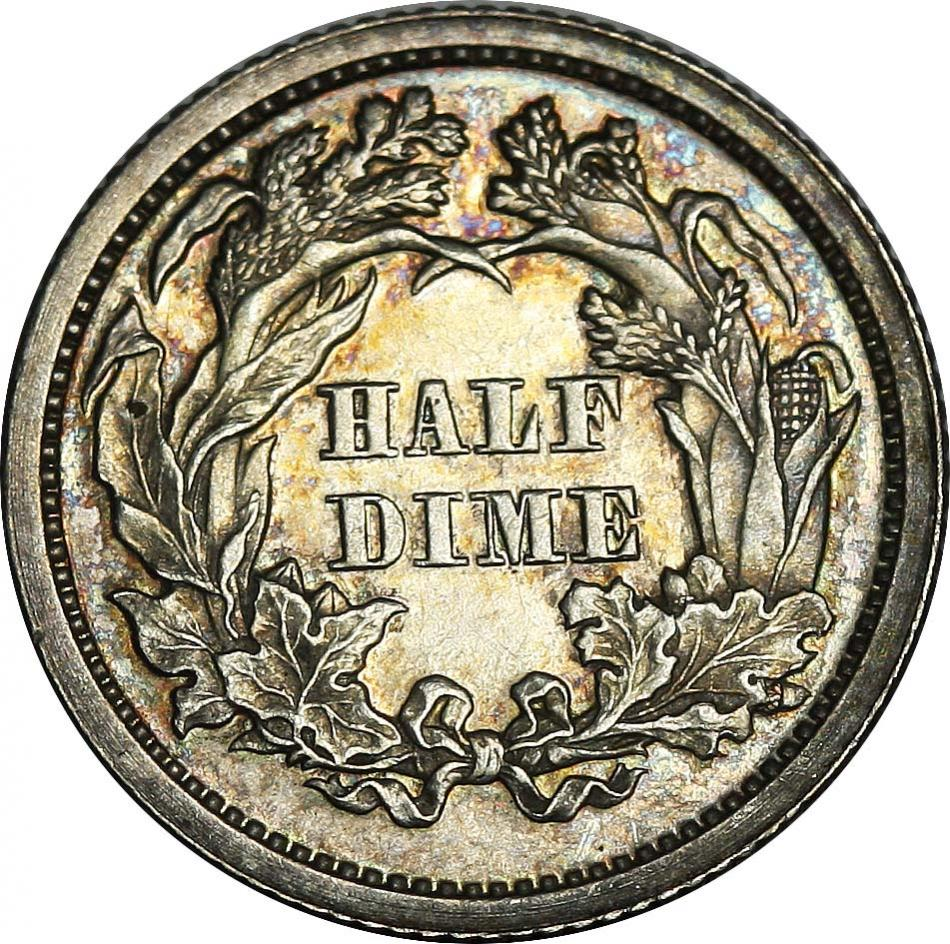
Longacre's reverse for the half dime (1860–1873)

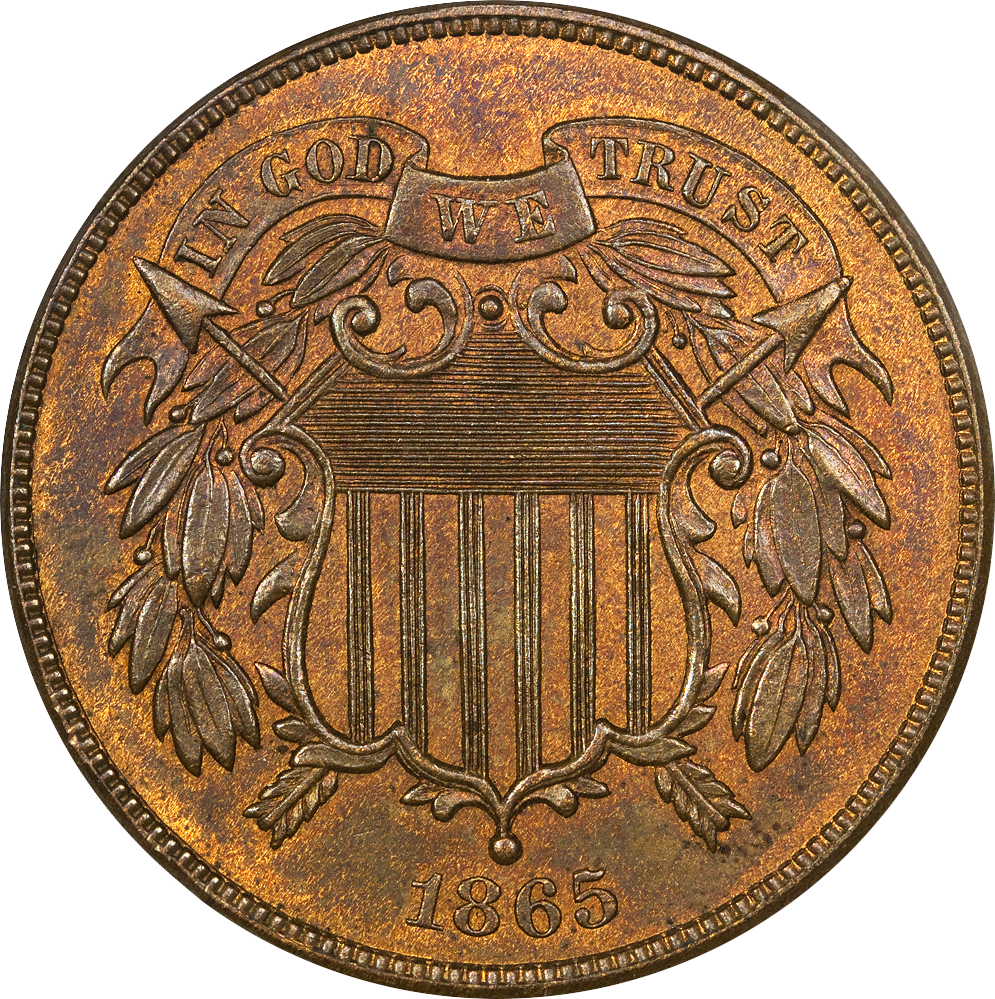
The two-cent piece as issued (1864–1873)

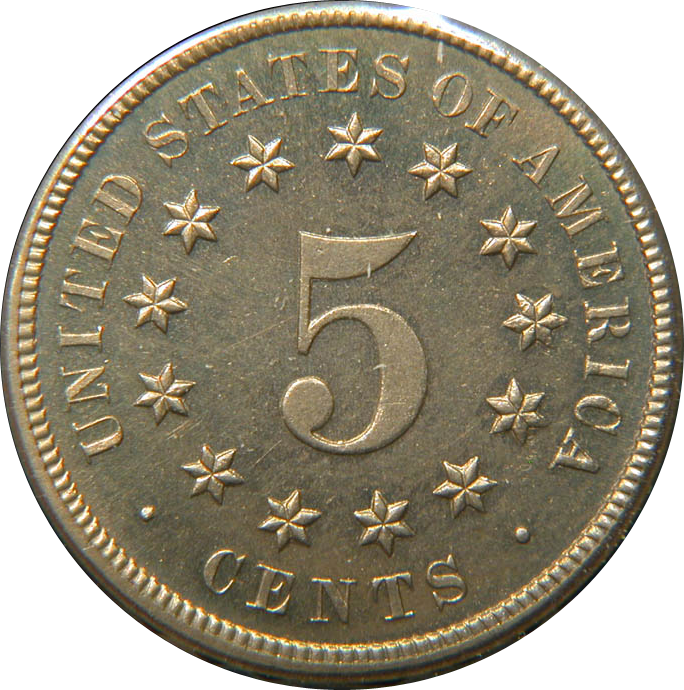
Reverse of the Shield nickel as modified by Longacre in 1867

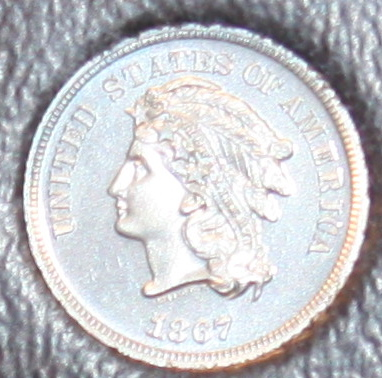
Unadopted 1867 pattern for the nickel

== Death and assessment ==
James Longacre died suddenly at his home in Philadelphia on January 1, 1869. A memorial meeting was held at the Philadelphia Mint on January 5, attended by the facility's employees. The Director of the Mint, Henry Linderman, delivered a speech in praise of Longacre prior to the formal eulogy, which was given by Longacre's assistant, William Barber, who would be appointed as Longacre's successor. Like each of his predecessors, Longacre died in office.

Longacre was recognized in an exhibit of 100 notable American engravers sponsored by the New York Public Library in 1928. In 1970, art historian Cornelius Vermeule, in his volume on U.S. coins, viewed Longacre and his works less favorably, "uniform in their dullness, lack of inspiration, and even quaintness, Longacre's contributions to patterns and regular coinage were a decided step backwards from the art of [Thomas] Sully, [Titian] Peale, [Robert] Hughes, and Gobrecht" and "whatever his previous qualities as an engraver of portraits, he seems not to have brought much imagination to his important post at the Philadelphia Mint." However, Vermeule considered the Flying Eagle cent more of a work of art, far above the mundane.

In his 1991 article, McKenzie notes Vermeule's concerns, but considers Longacre's work important for its use of American symbols, including the representations of Native Americans. He believes Longacre's use of such symbols influenced later coin designers, such as George T. Morgan, Victor D. Brenner, and Augustus Saint-Gaudens. He particularly praises the ornate scroll on the reverse of the double eagle, calling it "unique in American numismatic art and enhances the elegance of a design befitting the highest-denomination U.S. coin", and applauds "the exciting innovation in symbolism and expression of national sentiment that he brought to U.S. numismatic art".

According to Bowers, "Today, Longacre is widely admired by numismatists." Lange notes that Longacre's "artistic vision graced 60 years of American coins". Snow writes,

In view of the admiration that Saint-Gaudens, Vermeule, and others had for Longacre's "recycled" design borrowed from Gobrecht, and the enthusiasm collectors have for Flying Eagle cents today, perhaps it is all for the best that some other motif was not created in the 1850s at the Mint when experiments to eliminate the cumbersome large copper cent were conducted.

== U.S. coins designed by Longacre ==
- Flying Eagle cent (1856–1858)
- Indian Head cent (1859–1909)
- Two-cent piece (1864–1873)
- Three-cent piece in silver (1851–1873) and nickel (1865–1889)
- Shield nickel (1866–1883)
- Liberty Seated half dime reverse (1860–1873)
- Liberty Seated dime reverse (1860–1891), reused with slight modification as reverse of Barber dime (1892–1916)
- Liberty Head gold dollar (1849–1889)
- Three-dollar piece (1854–1889)
- Liberty Head double eagle (1849–1907)

== Bibliography ==
=== Books ===
- Bowers, Q. David (2001). The Harry W. Bass, Jr. Museum Sylloge. Dallas, Tex.: Harry W. Bass, Jr. Foundation. ISBN 978-0-943161-88-4.
- Bowers, Q. David (2006). A Guide Book of Shield and Liberty Head Nickels. Atlanta, GA: Whitman Publishing. ISBN 978-0-7948-1921-7.
- Breen, Walter (1988). Walter Breen's Complete Encyclopedia of U.S. and Colonial Coins. New York: Doubleday. ISBN 978-0-385-14207-6.
- Coin World Almanac (3rd ed.). Sidney, OH: Amos Press. 1977. ASIN B004AB7C9M.
- Evans, George G. (1885). Illustrated History of the United States Mint (revised ed.). Philadelphia: George G. Evans.
- Garrett, Jeff; Guth, Ron (2008). Encyclopedia of U.S. Gold Coins, 1795–1933 (second ed.). Atlanta, GA: Whitman Publishing. ISBN 978-0-7948-2254-5.
- Journal of the Executive Proceedings of the Senate of the United States of America. Vol. VI. Washington, DC: United States Government Printing Office. 1887.
- Lange, David W. (2006). History of the United States Mint and its Coinage. Atlanta, GA: Whitman Publishing. ISBN 978-0-7948-1972-9.
- Pessolano-Filos, Francis (1983). Margaret M. Walsh (ed.). The Assay Medals and the Assay Commissions, 1841–1977. New York: Eros Publishing Company. ISBN 978-0-911571-01-1.
- Snow, Richard (2009). A Guide Book of Flying Eagle and Indian Head Cents. Atlanta, GA: Whitman Publishing. ISBN 978-0-7948-2831-8.
- Taxay, Don (1983). The U.S. Mint and Coinage (reprint of 1966 ed.). New York: Sanford J. Durst Numismatic Publications. ISBN 978-0-915262-68-7.
- Vermeule, Cornelius (1971). Numismatic Art in America. Cambridge, MA: The Belknap Press of Harvard University Press. ISBN 978-0-674-62840-3.

=== Other sources ===
- "Death of James B. Longacre, Esq. – Meeting at the Mint". American Journal of Numismatics. 3 (9). New York: American Numismatic and Archaeological Society. January 1869.
- "Chile asks Longacre for dies in 1866". Iola, WS: Krause Publications. Archived from the original on March 8, 2014.
- DeLorey, Tom (October 1985). "Longacre: Unsung engraver of the U.S. Mint". The Numismatist. Colorado Springs, CO: American Numismatic Association: 1970–1978.
- Kay, Rick (April 2005). "The remarkable coinage of James B. Longacre". The Numismatist. Colorado Springs, CO: American Numismatic Association: 36–37, 40–41.
- McKenzie, Lee F. (December 1991). "Longacre's influence on numismatic art". The Numismatist. Colorado Springs, CO: American Numismatic Association: 1922–1924, 1979–1980.
- Smith, Pete (2012). "American numismatic biographies" (PDF). The Numismatic Bibliomania Society. Archived from the original (PDF) on August 10, 2013.

Government offices
Preceded by Christian Gobrecht	Chief Engraver of the U.S. Mint; 1844–1869	Succeeded by William Barber
