= Twenty-cent piece (United States) =

Coin of the United States (1875–1878)

- United States
- Value: 20 cents (0.20 US dollar)
- Mass: 5 g
- Diameter: 22 mm
- Edge: Plain
- Composition: 90% silver; 10% copper
- Silver: 0.1447 troy oz
- Years of minting: 1875–1878
- Mint marks: CC, S. Located beneath eagle on reverse. Philadelphia Mint specimens lack mint mark.

Obverse
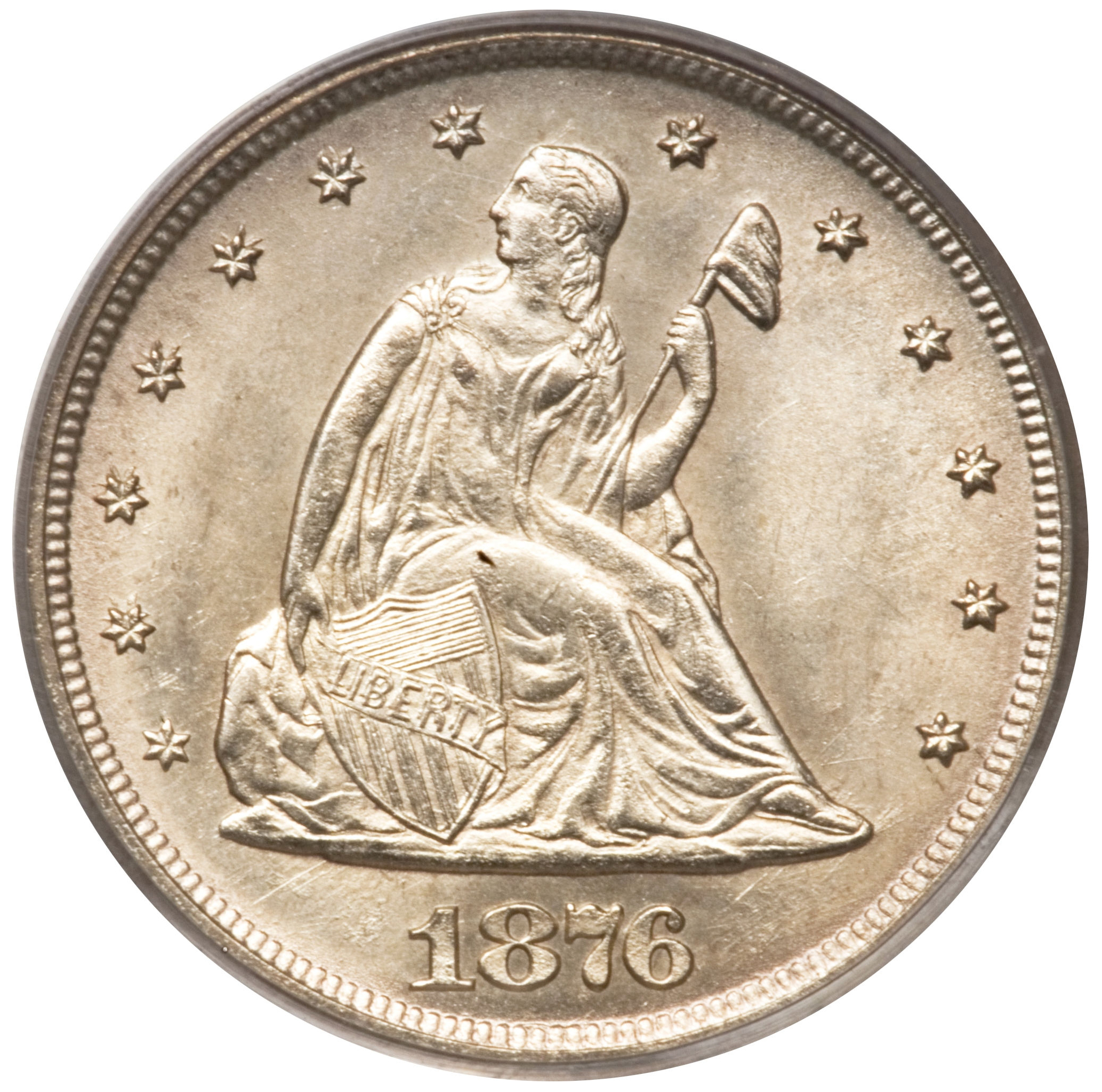
- Design: Liberty seated
- Designer: Christian Gobrecht
- Design date: 1836; 190 years ago (re-engraved by William Barber, 1875)

Reverse
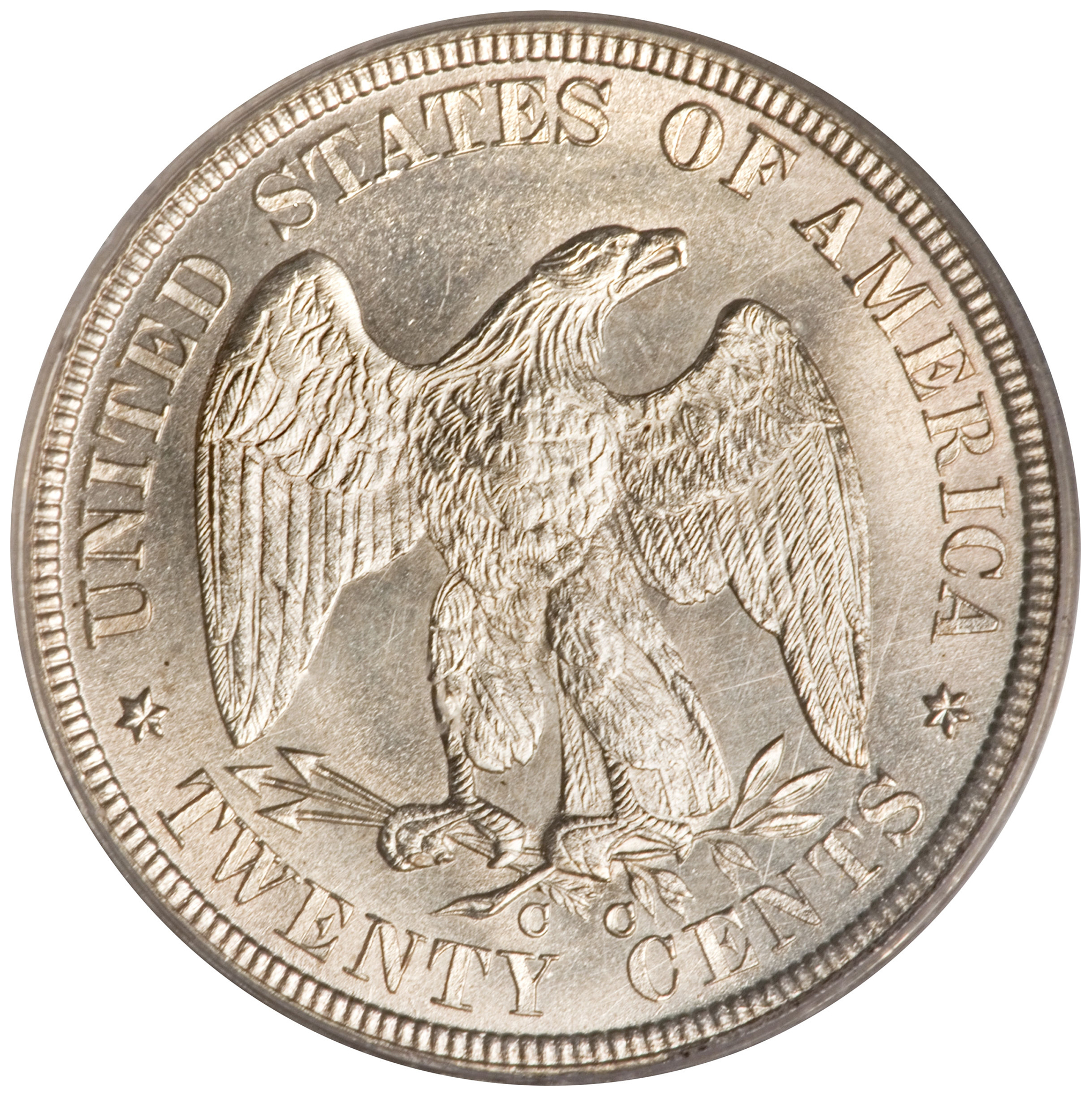
- Design: A left-facing bald eagle
- Designer: William Barber
- Design date: 1875; 151 years ago

The American twenty-cent piece is a coin struck from 1875 to 1878, but only for collectors in the final two years. Proposed by Nevada Senator John P. Jones, it proved a failure due to confusion with the quarter, to which it was close in both size and value.

In 1874, the newly elected Jones began pressing for a twenty-cent piece, which he stated would alleviate the shortage of small change in the Far West. The bill passed Congress, and Mint Director Henry Linderman ordered pattern coins struck. Linderman eventually decided on an obverse and reverse similar to that of other silver coins.

Although the coins have a smooth edge, rather than reeded as with other silver coins, the new piece was close to the size of, and immediately confused with, the quarter. Adding to the bewilderment, the obverse, or "heads", sides of both coins were almost identical. After the first year, in which over a million were minted, there was little demand, and the denomination was abolished in 1878. At least a third of the total mintage was later melted by the government. Numismatist Mark Benvenuto called the twenty-cent piece "a chapter of U.S. coinage history that closed almost before it began".

== Inception and authorization ==
A twenty-cent piece had been proposed as early as 1791, and again in 1806, but had been rejected. The 1806 bill, introduced by Connecticut Senator Uriah Tracy, sought both a two-cent piece and a "double dime". It was opposed by mint director Robert Patterson, though his opposition was more to the two-cent piece, which Tracy proposed be struck in billon, low-grade silver that would be difficult to recover when melting the coins. The bill passed the Senate twice, in 1806 and 1807, but did not pass the House of Representatives. No twenty-cent piece was issued prior to the 1870s, but Americans were familiar with the denomination as the two reales piece struck in Spain, known as a "pistareen" in the United States, passed for twenty cents (its Spanish colonial equivalent passed for a quarter).

Several factors converged to make possible a twenty-cent piece in the 1870s. The first was a shortage of small change in the far West, where base-metal coins did not circulate. Government payments in silver and gold had been suspended during the economic chaos caused by the Civil War—coins containing precious metal were hoarded except on the Pacific Coast, and did not pass at face value in trade. Although the base-metal nickel was not widely accepted in the far West, the silver half dime had been struck in increasing numbers at the San Francisco Mint until the silver coin, which did not circulate in the East, was abolished by Congress in 1873. A shortage of small change resulted, especially as half dimes were used in the jewelry trade; customers complained they could not get full change for an item costing ten cents for which they paid with a quarter. Prices in the West were sometimes in bits (12 1/2 cents, based on the old Spanish colonial real, although those pieces no longer circulated), adding to the change problem. Numismatist David Lange states that a shipment of nickels out West could have solved everything, but that they might not have been accepted due to the prejudice against money which did not contain precious metal.

A second factor was the anxiety of Congress to see more silver made into coin. This was due to pressure from mining and other interests. The Coinage Act of 1873 ended the practice of allowing silver producers to have their bullion struck into silver dollars and returned to them. Although producers had not deposited much silver in the years before 1873 due to high market prices, former mint director Henry Linderman foresaw that those prices would fall as mines became accessible due to the completion of the transcontinental railroad across the United States, and that the resultant coinage would inflate the currency. He quietly urged Congress to end the practice, which it did. Within a year, silver prices had dropped, and producers tried vainly to deposit bullion at the mints for conversion into legal tender. Mining interests sought other means of selling silver to the government.

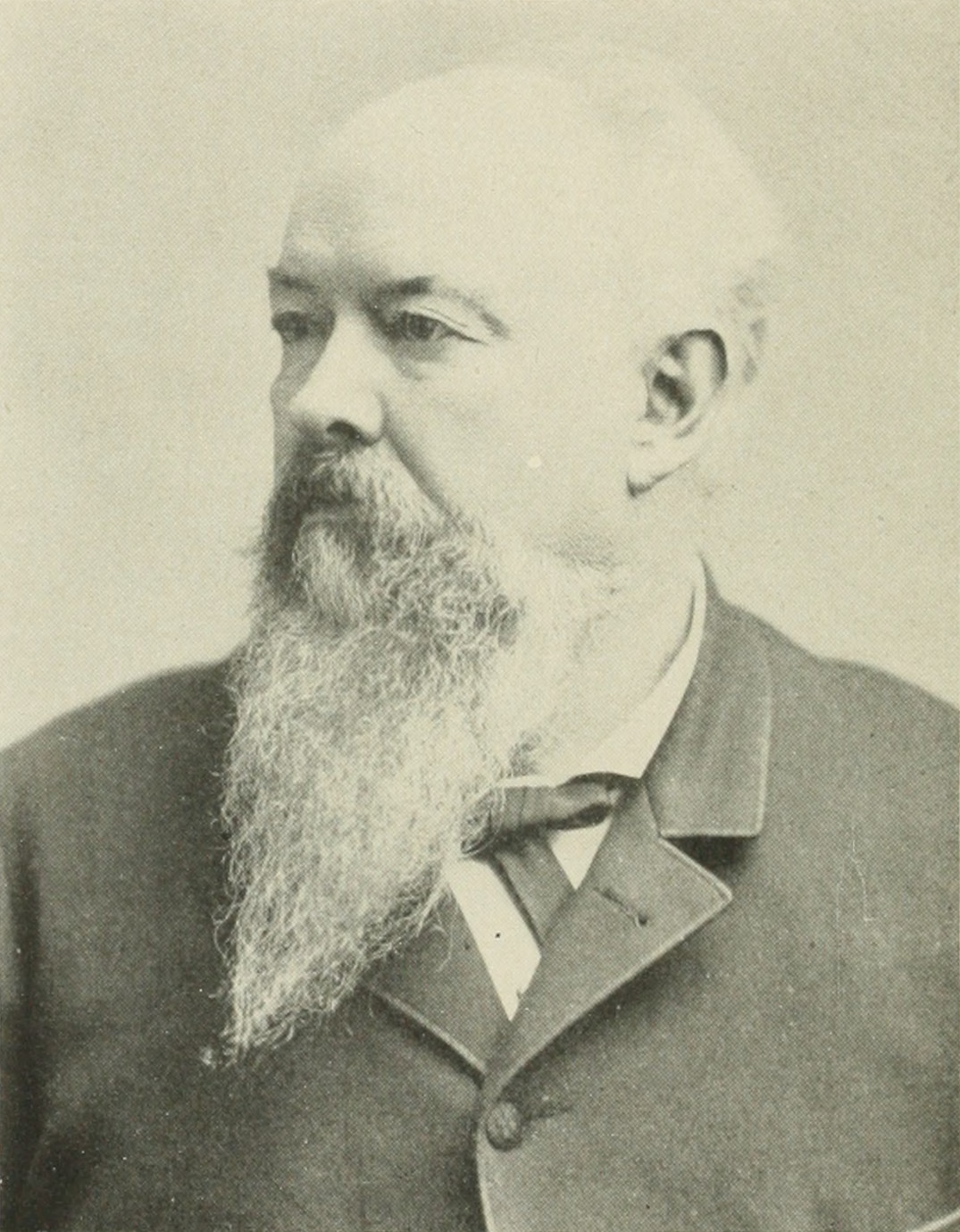
Senator John P. Jones

The third was American interest in aligning its currency with the Latin Monetary Union and to bring its weights for coinage into the metric system. Several times in the 1860s and 1870s, the United States Mint struck pattern coins that were to be used if America joined, in some cases with the equivalent in foreign money struck as part of the design. The twenty-cent piece was to be equivalent to one French franc in that system, and if in proportion to the smaller silver coins being struck, (Note: That is, not the trade dollar, that would weigh more in proportion and which was not intended to circulate in the United States. The standard silver dollar had been discontinued in 1873.) would weigh five grams, a fact which appealed to advocates of the metric system in Congress. Another purpose for a large issue of silver coins, regardless of denomination, was to retire the fractional currency—low-value paper money or "shinplasters". Congress passed legislation in 1875 and 1876 for large quantities of silver coins for this purpose.

The father of the twenty-cent piece was Nevada Senator John P. Jones. Part-owner of the Crown Point Mine, he had been elected to the Senate in 1873; on February 10, 1874, he introduced a bill to authorize a twenty-cent piece, one of his first legislative endeavors. In advocating for the proposal, he cited the lack of small change in the West. It was endorsed by mint director Linderman; according to numismatic historian Walter Breen, "other legislators went along with it, largely as a favor to Sen. Jones". The bill was signed into law by President Ulysses S. Grant on March 3, 1875. Like other denominations of silver coin, the twenty-cent piece was made legal tender up to five dollars.

== Preparation and design ==
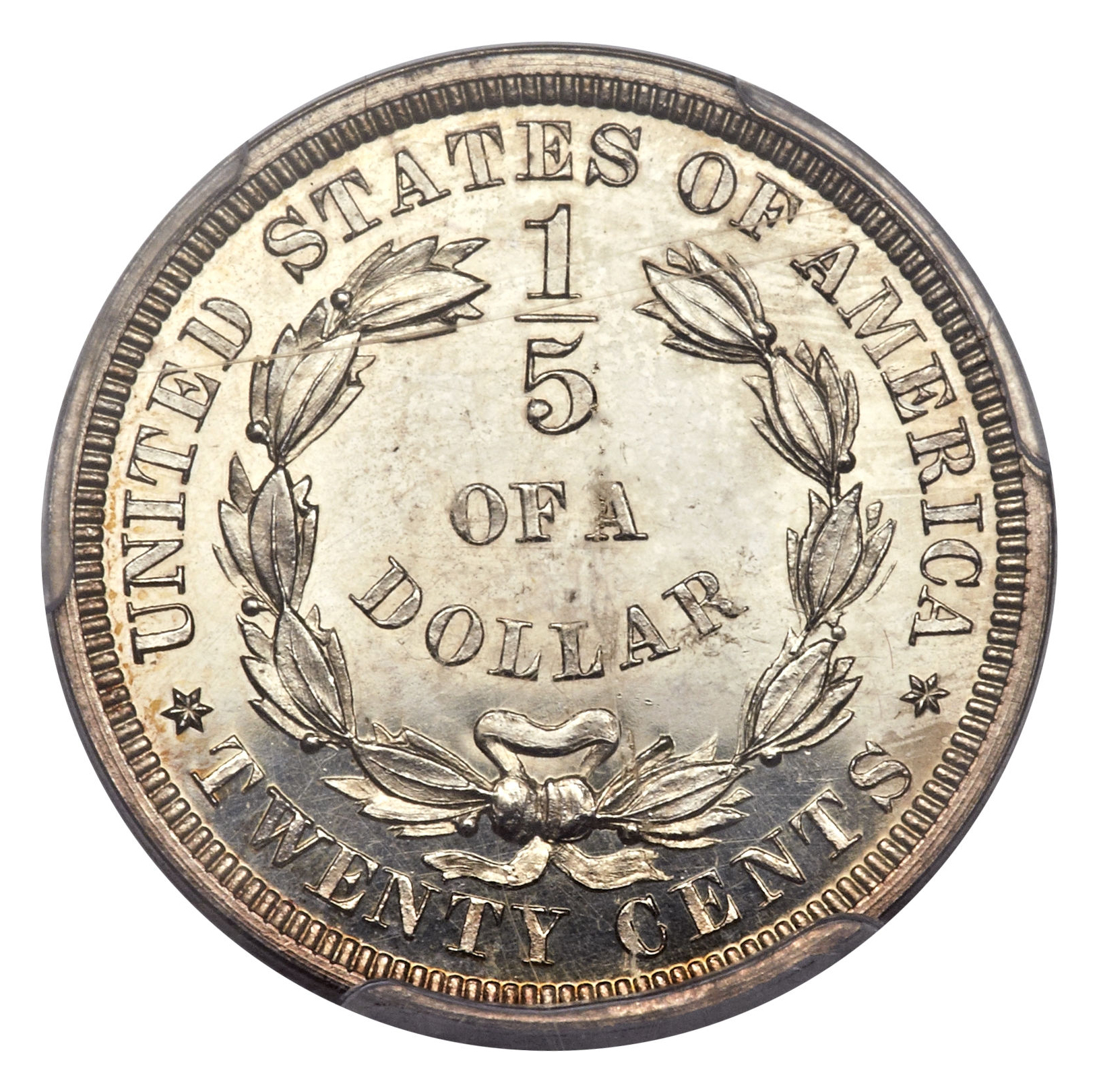
Pattern reverse designating the denomination as a fifth of a dollar. The obverse is the Seated Liberty, dated 1875.

In anticipation of the approval of the legislation, Linderman had pattern coins prepared. In August 1874, Philadelphia Mint superintendent James Pollock sent him patterns with an obverse showing a seated Liberty by Philadelphia sculptor Joseph A. Bailly with a reverse by chief engraver William Barber. Pollock did not approve Bailly's proposal, deeming it too similar to the Seated Liberty design which was then on all domestic silver coinage, and so the new coin would too closely resemble the quarter. On March 31, 1875, after the enactment of Jones's bill, Pollock sent Linderman additional patterns, all by Barber, and even more on April 12. Pollock deprecated a reverse design with a shield, but Linderman liked it and stated that it would have been adopted but for the law requiring an eagle to appear on silver pieces larger than the dime. Linderman selected an obverse design near-identical to the other silver coinage (until 1916, the silver coins were given similar appearances). That design, by the late chief engraver, Christian Gobrecht, following a concept by Thomas Sully and Titian Peale, was first used in 1836 and by 1840 was on all denominations of silver coins then being struck. The right-facing eagle is near-identical to the one which Barber had rendered for the trade dollar, which had debuted in 1873. Linderman had realized that the difference in size between the new coin and quarter was small, and thought a scaled-down version of the trade dollar suitable for the twenty-cent piece; he got his way on the reverse. The eagle carries the arrows of war in its right, or dominant claw, and the olive branch of peace in the left, in heraldry preferring war over peace.

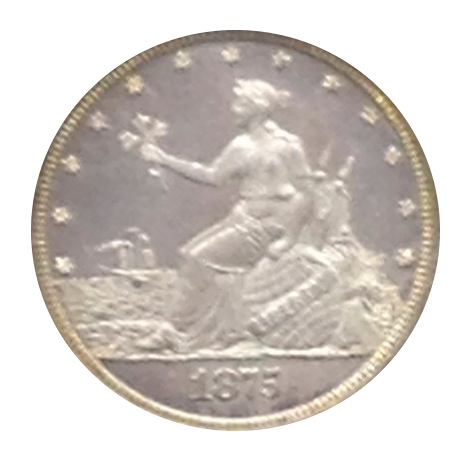
The "Liberty by the Seashore" pattern coin

Art historian Cornelius Vermeule described the twenty-cent piece's obverse as "a pleasing synthesis of traditional elements". He was less complimentary about the eagle on the reverse, calling it awkward and a fatter version of the eagle on 18th-century American coinage. Vermeule admired the pattern designs made by Barber, especially the "Liberty by the Seashore" motif, which the historian believes owes a debt to the British copper coins of that period depicting Britannia—Barber was an Englishman by birth. He deemed it appropriate that the ship that is visible is powered by steam.

Numismatist Yancey Rayburn, in his 1970 article, wrote that the twenty-cent piece is bare of much of the lettering common on US coins: neither "In God We Trust" nor "E Pluribus Unum" appears on it. At the time, "E Pluribus Unum" was required on American coins under the 1873 act; "In God We Trust" was included on different coins at the discretion of the secretary of the treasury. The mottos were excluded as the coin was considered too small to contain them. The act creating the twenty-cent piece did not dictate its design, but provided that the new coin was to be subject to the terms of the 1873 act. Rayburn also admired that the full denomination, "twenty cents", was spelled out; at that time the quarter and fifty-cent piece had the word "dollar" abbreviated as "dol."

== Production, aftermath, and collecting ==
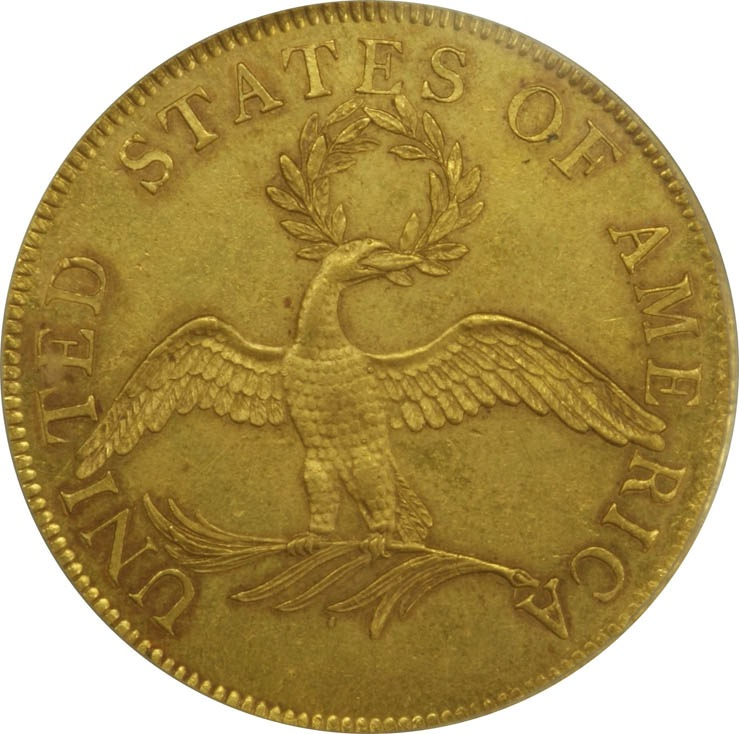
Reverse of a 1796 ten-dollar piece. Cornelius Vermeule deemed the eagle on the twenty-cent piece a fatter version of the bird on this coin.

The design for the twenty-cent piece was approved on April 12, 1875. It was, however, immediately revised to better define the olive leaves at the right end of the branch (over the N and the T in "cents"); on the original design, the leaves overlapped with each other. An amended approval was given on April 15. Production began at Philadelphia on May 19, on June 1 at the Carson City Mint in Jones's home state of Nevada, and between June 1 and 17 at the San Francisco Mint. Only about 40,000 were struck at Philadelphia; the bulk was at the two Western mints with 133,290 minted at Carson City, and 1,155,000 at San Francisco. The price of silver had not dropped to the point where Congress was willing to authorize redemption of paper money with silver coin, and would not until April 1876, lowering the need to strike the pieces at Philadelphia. Additionally, the coin was principally intended for circulation in the West, another reason for a low mintage at Philadelphia. Mint officials had overestimated the need for the piece at San Francisco, where it saw some public acceptance and the large mintage satisfied the modest public demand until treasury officials ordered stocks melted in 1877.

Although the mint had given the twenty-cent piece a smooth rim, rather than the reeded one on the quarter, the two pieces were immediately confused. At 22 millimeters (0.87 in), the twenty-cent piece was only slightly smaller than the quarter at 24.3 millimeters (0.96 in), and the two pieces had near-identical obverses. Mistakes in change-making were widespread, and the twenty-cent piece quickly became extremely unpopular. In April 1876, when Congress began to allow the redemption of fractional currency with coin, the twenty-cent piece was listed as among the denominations that could be exchanged for the low-denomination paper. Nevertheless, in July, legislation was introduced to abolish the twenty-cent piece. Although the bill did not pass immediately, according to numismatist Vernon Brown in his article on the piece, the pendency of the bill convinced the mint that there was no point in striking further twenty-cent pieces. The mintage for 1876 was low (coining took place at Philadelphia and Carson City), and only proof specimens were coined in 1877 and 1878, at Philadelphia. Most of the 1876 Philadelphia mintage were sold as souvenirs at the Centennial Exposition.

In March 1877, Linderman authorized the melting of 12,359 twenty-cent pieces at Carson City. This included almost the entire mintage from 1876 (about 10,000) and created one of the great American numismatic rarities, the 1876-CC twenty-cent piece. Fewer than two dozen are known; one sold at auction for $870,000 in 2022. In her 2003 article, numismatist Michele Orzano suggests that the few survivors were souvenirs obtained by visitors to the mint.

Congress abolished the twenty-cent piece on May 2, 1878. The previous day, Linderman had ordered the mints to melt down twenty-cent pieces on hand, for recoinage into other denominations. By then, forces for silver coinage had been victorious in passing the Bland–Allison Act, requiring the government to purchase large quantities of silver bullion, and strike it into dollars. The piece continued to circulate in the West for a few years, but by 1890 was rarely seen. Of the 1,351,540 twenty-cent pieces minted for circulation, over a third were melted by the government between 1895 and 1954, most heavily in 1933. The least expensive twenty-cent piece, according to the 2014 edition of R. S. Yeoman's A Guide Book of United States Coins (the Red Book), is the 1875-S, listed at $110 in good-4 condition. According to commentary in the Red Book, the twenty-cent piece failed because "the public was confused over the coin's similarity to the quarter dollar, which was better established as a foundation of American commerce", that fractional currency satisfied the need for small change in the East, and because "the twenty-cent piece was essentially just a substitute for two dimes".

== Mintages ==
The mint mark letters indicate which mint produced the coin (parentheses indicate lack of a mint mark). The mint mark appears under the eagle on the reverse.

- P (Philadelphia Mint)
- CC (Carson City Mint)
- S (San Francisco Mint)

Year	Mint mark	Circulation strikes	Proof
1875	(P)	36,910	2,790
1875	CC	133,290	–
1875	S	1,155,000	12
1876	(P)	14,640	1,260
1876	CC	10,000	–
1877	(P)	–	510
1878	(P)	–	600
