= Shield nickel =

First US five cent piece to be made out of copper-nickel

- United States
- Value: 5 cents (0.05 US dollars)
- Mass: 5.000 g (0.1615 troy oz)
- Diameter: 20.50 mm (0.8077 in)
- Edge: Plain
- Composition: 75% copper; 25% nickel
- Years of minting: 1866–1883

Obverse
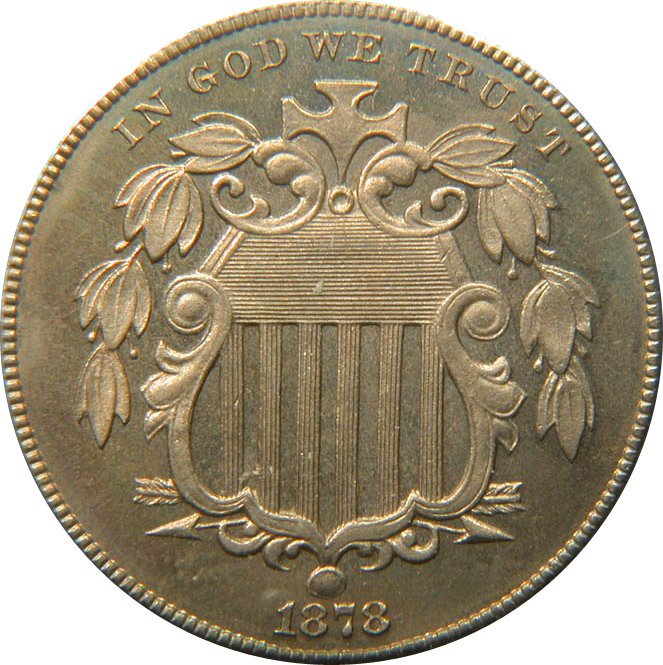
- Design: Shield representing the United States
- Designer: James B. Longacre
- Design date: 1866

Reverse
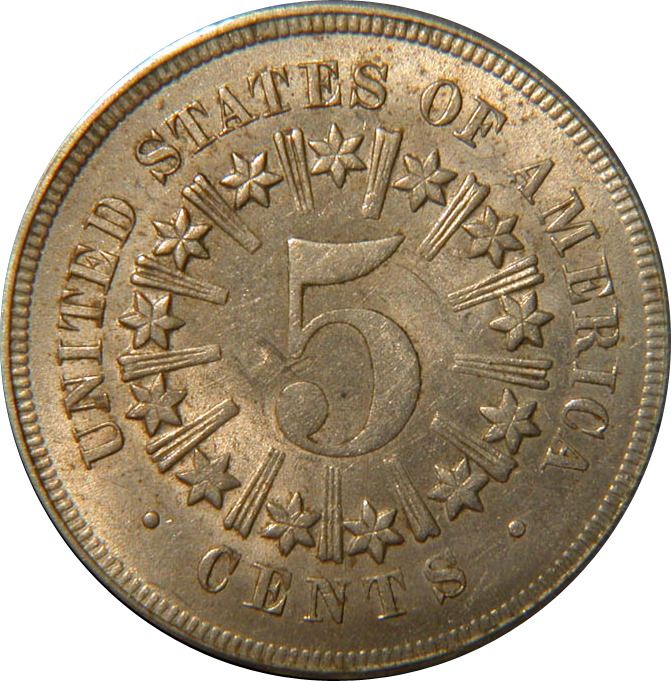
- Design: Denomination surrounded by stars, separated by rays
- Designer: James B. Longacre
- Design date: 1866
- Design discontinued: 1867
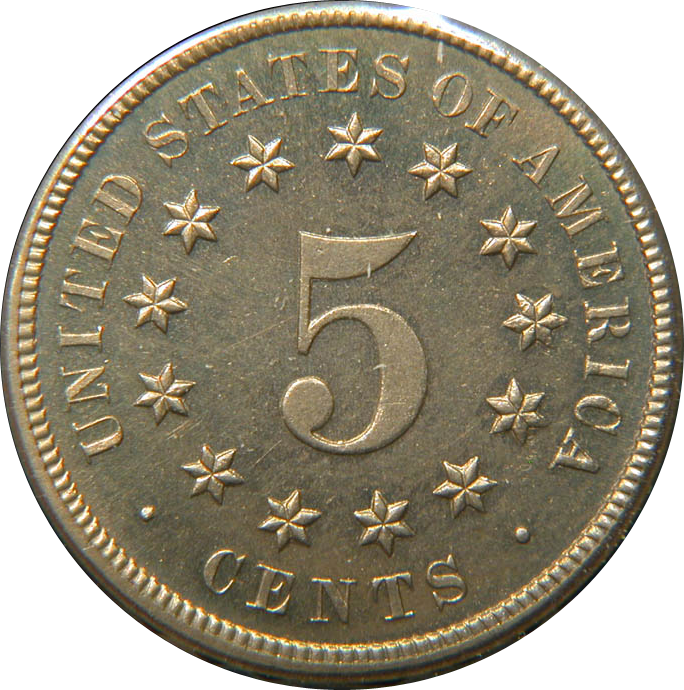
- Design: Denomination surrounded by stars, rays removed
- Designer: James B. Longacre
- Design date: 1867
- Design discontinued: 1883

The Shield nickel was the first United States five-cent piece to be made out of copper-nickel, the same alloy of which American nickels are struck today. Designed by James B. Longacre, the coin was issued from 1866 until 1883, when it was replaced by the Liberty Head nickel. The coin takes its name from the motif on its obverse, and was the first five-cent coin referred to as a "nickel"—silver pieces of that denomination had been known as half dimes.

Silver half dimes had been struck from the early days of the United States Mint in the late 18th century. Those disappeared from circulation, along with most other coins, in the economic turmoil of the Civil War. In 1864, the Mint successfully introduced low-denomination coins, whose intrinsic worth did not approach their face value. Industrialist Joseph Wharton advocated coins containing nickel—a metal in which he had significant financial interests. When the Mint proposed a copper-nickel five-cent piece, Congress required that the coin be heavier than the Mint had suggested, allowing Wharton to sell more of the metal to the government.

Longacre's design was based on his two-cent pieces, and it symbolizes the strength of a unified America. The nickel proved difficult to strike and the reverse, or tails, design was modified in 1867. Even so, production difficulties continued, causing many minor varieties which are collected today. Minting of the Shield nickel for circulation was suspended in 1876 for a period of over two years due to a glut of low-denomination coinage, and it was struck in only small quantities until 1882. The following year, the coin was replaced by Charles E. Barber's Liberty head design.

== Background and authorization ==
Five-cent pieces had been struck by the United States Mint since 1792. They were the first coins struck by Mint authorities. These half dimes (originally spelled "half dismes"), were struck in silver. The alloy used was originally .892 silver with the remainder copper; in 1837 the silver portion was increased to .900.

The Civil War caused most American coins to vanish from circulation, with the gap filled by such means as merchant tokens, encased postage stamps, and United States fractional currency, issued in denomination as low as three cents. Although specie (gold or silver coins) was hoarded or exported, the copper-nickel cent, then the only base metal denomination being struck, also vanished. In 1864, Congress began the process of restoring coins to circulation by abolishing the three-cent note and authorizing bronze cents and two-cent pieces, with low intrinsic values, to be struck. These new coins initially proved popular, though the two-cent piece soon faded from circulation. On March 3, 1865, Congress passed legislation authorizing the Mint to strike three-cent pieces of 75% copper and 25% nickel.

In 1864, Congress had authorized a third series of fractional currency notes. The five-cent note was to bear a portrait of "Clark", but Congress was appalled when the issue came out not bearing a portrait of William Clark, the explorer, but Spencer M. Clark, head of the Currency Bureau. According to numismatic historian Walter Breen, Congress's "immediate infuriated response was to pass a law retiring the 5¢ denomination, and another to forbid portrayal of any living person on federal coins or currency." Clark only kept his job because of the personal intervention of Treasury Secretary Salmon P. Chase.

Mint Director James Pollock had been opposed to striking coins containing nickel but in view of the initial success of the copper-nickel three-cent piece, he became an advocate of striking five-cent pieces in the same metal. In his 1865 report Pollock wrote, "From this nickel alloy, a coin for the denomination of five cents, and which would be a popular substitute for the five cent note, could easily be made ... [The five cent coin should be struck in base metal] only until the resumption of specie payments ... in time of peace ... coins of inferior alloy should not be permitted to take the place permanently of silver in the coinage of pieces above the denomination of three cents."

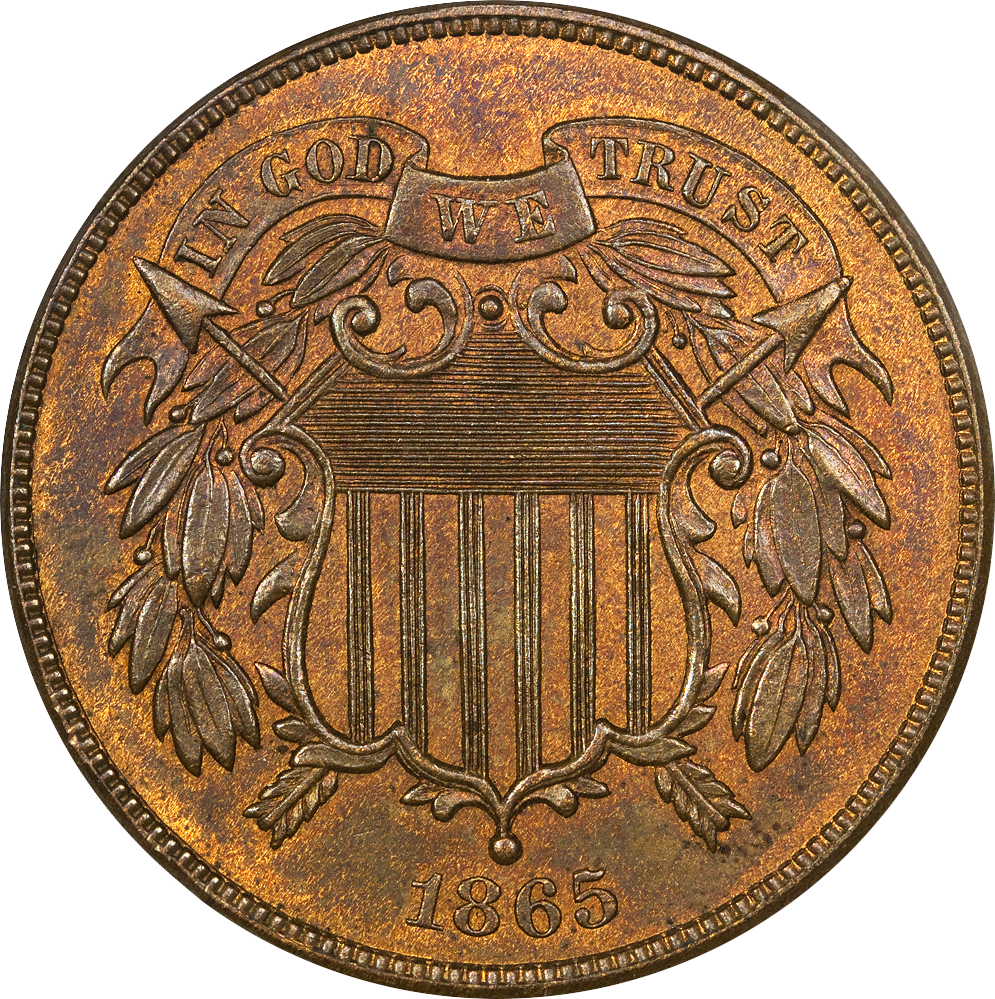
Longacre's two-cent piece; its design was the basis for the Shield nickel.

Industrialist Joseph Wharton had a near-monopoly on the mining of nickel in the United States and sought to promote its use in coinage. He was also highly influential in Congress. His friends there, though they had failed to obtain the metal's use for the two-cent piece, had been more successful with the three-cent coin. Pollock prepared a bill authorizing a five-cent coin of the same alloy as the three-cent piece and a total weight not to exceed 60 grains (3.9 g). At the committee stage in the House of Representatives, the weight was amended to 77.19 grains (5.00 g), ostensibly to make the weight equal to five grams in the metric system (Note: A new U.S. nickel still weighs exactly 5 grams. U.S. Mint, "Coin Specifications") but more likely so that Wharton could sell more nickel. This made the new coin heavy in comparison to the three-cent copper-nickel coin. The bill passed without debate on May 16, 1866. The new copper-nickel coin was legal tender for up to one dollar, and would be paid out by the Treasury in exchange for coin of the United States, excluding the half cent, cent and two-cent. It was redeemable in lots of $100 for banknotes. Fractional currency in denominations of less than ten cents was withdrawn.

== Design and production ==
Since coinage was to begin immediately, it was necessary for the Mint's chief engraver, James B. Longacre to prepare a design as quickly as possible. With the five cent authorization bill pending in Congress, Longacre had produced patterns as early as late 1865. Longacre produced pattern coins, one with a shield similar to the design he had prepared for the two-cent piece. Longacre altered the two-cent design by shifting the location of the two arrows in the design, removed the scroll on which "In God We Trust" had been inscribed (the first time that motto had appeared on a U.S. coin), and added a cross, apparently intending a pattee to the top of the shield. (Note: Peters & Mohon 1995, p. 3. Shield nickel expert Howard Spindel questions whether a pattee was intended, citing differences between the cross used on the coin and a heraldic pattee. Bowers 2006, p. 63.) Another pattern depicted Washington, while another showed the recently assassinated president, Abraham Lincoln. Reverse designs proposed by Longacre included one with a number 5 within a circle of thirteen stars, each separated from the next by rays. Another reverse design featured the numeral within a wreath. Treasury Secretary Hugh McCulloch, acting on Pollock's recommendation, selected the shield design for the obverse, or "heads" side, and the stars and rays design for the reverse. Pollock did not show McCulloch the Lincoln design, believing it would not be well received in the South.

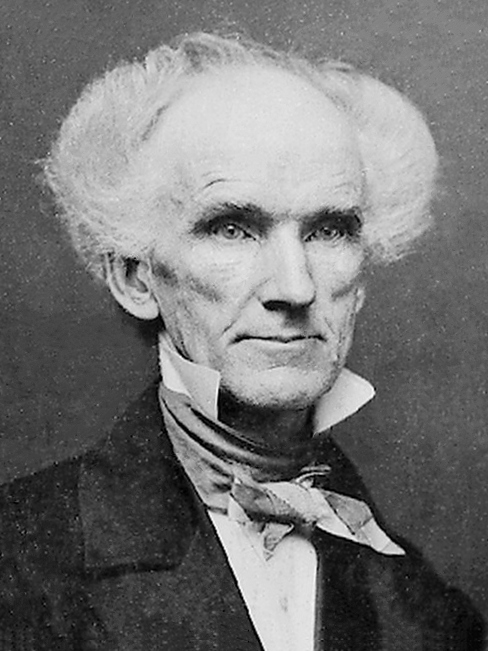
James Barton Longacre

According to numismatic author Q. David Bowers, Longacre's obverse design is "one of the most patriotic motifs in American coinage". Based on the coat of arms from the Great Seal of the United States, Longacre's design focused on the shield, or escutcheon as a defensive weapon, symbolizing strength and self-protection through unity. The upper part of the shield, or "chief", symbolizes Congress, while the 13 vertical stripes, or "paleways" symbolize the states; consequently the entire escutcheon symbolizes the strength of the federal government through the unity of the states. The crossed arrows, whose ends are visible near the bottom of the shield, symbolize nonaggression, but imply readiness against attack. The laurel branches, taken from Greek tradition, symbolize victory. In heraldic engraving, vertical lines represent red, clear areas white and horizontal lines blue, thus the escutcheon is colored red, white and blue and is meant to evoke the American flag. Bowers does not consider the reverse design an artistic work, but one which is purely mechanical, obtained by punching characters and devices into a steel hub.

The new coins proved difficult to produce; due to the hardness of the planchet, the coins were not of high quality and the life of the striking dies was brief. The design of the coins was widely criticized, with Wharton describing the shield design as suggesting "a tombstone surmounted by a cross and overhung by weeping willows." The American Journal of Numismatics described it as "the ugliest of all known coins". More seriously, the reverse design reminded many of the "stars and bars" motif of the defeated Confederate States. The rays were eliminated from the design in early 1867, in the hopes of eliminating some of the production problems. The transition to the new design was to occur on February 1, 1867, but it is likely the mint used up the remaining dies with the old design in the interest of economy. The design change created confusion among the population, with many people assuming one design or the other was a counterfeit, and the Mint considered abandoning the shield design entirely. | Seeking alternatives to the difficult-to-work copper-nickel alloy, in June 1867 Longacre proposed that the five-cent piece be struck in aluminum. The new Mint director, Henry Linderman, objected to the proposal, stating that the price and supply of aluminum were as yet uncertain, and that the metal was too expensive to use in a minor coin. Numismatic historian Don Taxay, in his history of the United States Mint and its coins, noted that Linderman had proposed legislation increasing the proportion of nickel in the alloy to a third despite having earlier opposed the use of nickel in coins. Taxay suggested that Linderman was most likely influenced by Wharton and the metal's other advocates.

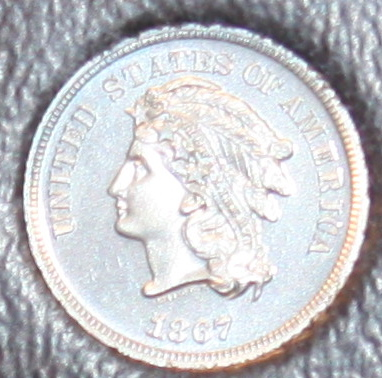
1867 "Indian Head" pattern

By late 1869, enough nickels, as the coin came to be called, had been produced to meet the needs of commerce, and production dropped off. The new coins tended to accumulate in the hands of merchants beyond the legal tender limit, but banks refused to accept them beyond the one-dollar maximum. Storeowners were forced to discount the coins to brokers. Postmasters, compelled by law to accept the coins, found that the Treasury would not accept them as deposits except in lots of $100, in accordance with the authorizing statute. In 1871, Congress alleviated the problem by passing legislation allowing the Treasury to redeem unlimited quantities of nickels and other low-denomination coins when presented in lots of not less than $20. It would not be until 1933, long after the shield design passed from the scene, that the nickel was made legal tender without limit.

The Mint Act of 1873 ended the production of the half dime. Despite the abolition, the silver pieces continued to circulate in the West, where silver or gold coins were preferred, and the nickel was disliked, throughout the remainder of the 19th century. The act also gave the Mint Director the authority to suspend production of any denomination if additional coins were not needed. Improved economic conditions, combined with low silver prices, brought large quantities of hoarded silver coinage, including half dimes, into circulation beginning in April 1876. In late 1876, production of the Shield nickel was halted under the 1873 act. No Shield nickels were struck in 1877 or 1878, excepting proof specimens for collectors. As the Treasury had a large stock of nickels in storage, only small numbers were struck over the next few years; full-scale production began again on December 12, 1881. The 1880 nickel, with only 16,000 pieces struck for circulation, remains the rarest non-proof Shield nickel today.

=== Varieties ===
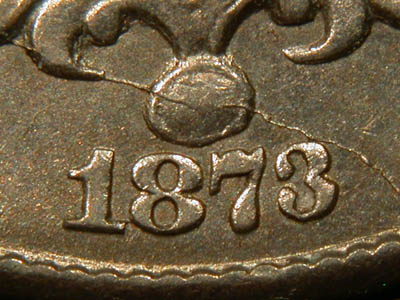
1873 "closed 3" variety

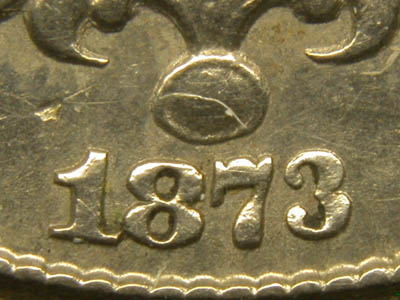
1873 "open 3" variety

The Shield nickel series has yielded a large number of varieties. Howard Spindel, a leading expert on Shield nickels, notes that Shield nickel dies produced far fewer coins than other coin dies, as the dies wore out so fast that the Mint was continually under great pressure to produce new ones. According to Spindel, many dies were hastily and carelessly produced, producing numerous minor varieties.

Bowers points to the 1868 nickel as "a playground for repunching [repunched dates], errors, and the like". Specialists have found more than one hundred and eighty different doubled die varieties, caused by misalignment when the heated die was repeatedly pressed against the hub to transfer the design. There are several different kinds of repunched dates, including a variety in which the numeral "1" is much smaller than usually found on the Shield nickel.

As with many denominations of United States coins, there are two major varieties of the 1873 piece. The initial variety, known as the "close 3" or "closed 3", was struck first. These coins led to a complaint by the chief coiner, A. Loudon Snowden, to Pollock, who was again director of the Mint. Snowden stated that the numeral "3" in the date too closely resembled an "8". The Mint prepared new date punches, in which the arms of the 3 did not curl around toward the center, creating the second variety, the "open 3".

The final year of production saw an overdate, 1883/2, with a visible "2" under or near the digit "3". This variety was caused by the use of 1882-dated dies which were not destroyed at the end of the year, but were instead repunched with a four-digit logotype, "1883". Five different dies are known to have been so reused, and Bowers estimates a mintage of 118,975 pieces. Spindel estimates that only 0.2%–0.3% of the pieces have survived to the present.

== Replacement ==
The 1867 redesign of the reverse had not solved the problems of short die life and poor striking; with a view to a redesign, pattern coins were struck in 1868 and 1871, but the Shield nickel remained in production. Charles E. Barber became chief engraver in 1880, and the following year was asked to produce uniform designs for the nickel, the three-cent piece, and a proposed copper-nickel cent. While the redesign of the two lower denominations did not occur, in 1882, Barber's design for the nickel, with the head of the goddess of Liberty on the obverse and the Roman numeral "V" on the reverse, was approved. The following year the Barber design replaced the Shield nickel. The Barber design was first struck on Jan. 30, 1883 and placed in circulation Feb. 1, 1883. Mint officials desired to discourage hoarding and speculation of 1883 proof Shield nickels, and received permission on Feb. 6, 1883 to continue production of proof Shield nickels concurrent with proofs of the new Liberty Head nickel. Proof Shield nickels continued to be struck until June 26, 1883 when the last 1500 proof shield nickels were produced.

== Mintages ==
Year	Proofs	Circulation strikes
1866	600+	14,742,500
1867 with rays	25+	2,019,000
1867 without rays	600+	28,890,500
1868	600+	28,817,000
1869	600+	16,395,000
1870	1,000+	4,806,000
1871	960+	561,000
1872	950+	6,036,000
1873 closed 3	1,100+	436,050 (est.)
1873 open 3	0	4,113,950 (est.)
1874	700+	3,538,000
1875	700+	2,097,000
1876	1,150+	2,530,000
1877 proof only	510+	0
1878 proof only	2,350	0
1879	3,200	25,900
1880	3,955	16,000
1881	3,575	68,800
1882	3,100	11,472,900
1883	5,419	1,451,500

Shield nickel proof mintages from before 1878 are modern estimates and may vary—for example, Bowers estimates 800–1,200 for the 1866 piece, while Peters estimates 375+. The issue is complicated by the fact that restrikes were made of proofs, sometimes years after the inscribed date. Mint officials, despite what Bowers terms "official denials (a.k.a. lies)", reused dies which had supposedly been destroyed to strike pieces for favored collectors or dealers. This practice led to incongruous pieces, with a dated obverse mated with a reverse not placed in use until years later.

All pieces struck at the Philadelphia mint, without mintmark.

== See also ==
- Metric Act of 1866

== Bibliography ==
- Bowers, Q. David (2006). A Guide Book of Shield and Liberty Head Nickels. Atlanta, Ga.: Whitman Publishing. ISBN 978-0-7948-1921-7.
- * Breen, Walter (1988). Walter Breen's Complete Encyclopedia of U.S. and Colonial Coins. New York, N.Y.: Doubleday. ISBN 978-0-385-14207-6. OL 4404444M.
- Lange, David W. (2006). History of the United States Mint and its Coinage. Atlanta, Ga.: Whitman Publishing. ISBN 978-0-7948-1972-9.
- Montgomery, Paul; Borckardt, Mark; Knight, Ray (2005). Million Dollar Nickel. Irvine, Ca.: Zyrus Press Inc. ISBN 978-0-9742371-8-3.
- Peters, Gloria; Mohon, Cynthia (1995). The Complete Guide to Shield & Liberty Head Nickels. Virginia Beach, Va.: DLRC Press. ISBN 978-1-880731-52-9.
- Taxay, Don (1983). The U.S. Mint and Coinage (reprint of 1966 ed.). New York, N.Y.: Sanford J. Durst Numismatic Publications. ISBN 978-0-915262-68-7.
- Yeoman, R.S. (2017). Bressett, Kenneth (ed.). A Guide Book of United States Coins 2018 (71th ed.). Atlanta, Georgia: Whitman Publishing. ISBN 978-0794845032.

=== Online ===
- U.S. Mint. "Coin Specifications". Archived from the original on 2015-02-18.
