= Great Kentucky Hoard =

American gold coin hoard found in 2023

- Material: Over 700 gold coins
- Created: 1840–1863
- Discovered: 2023; Kentucky, United States

The Great Kentucky Hoard is a hoard of more than 700 gold coins unearthed in an undisclosed part of Kentucky, United States, in the 2020s by a man on his own land. The finder of the hoard has remained anonymous.

There were a total of more than 800 Civil War–era coins, of which over 700 were gold coins. The Numismatic Guaranty Company (NGC), a coin-certifying company, put the coins in coin slabs (sealed holders). The website GOVMINT sold the coins.

== Background ==
The coins were found in a cornfield in Kentucky sometime before 2023; the exact location was not revealed. The person who found the hoard requested anonymity and sources say that he is a man. Many of the coins were found in the ground with pieces of a cloth bag and one of the coins was damaged from farm equipment. There were a total of 800 Civil War–era coins in the hoard and 700 of them were gold coins.

== History ==
The date on the latest coins of the hoard was 1863. In May 1861 the Kentucky Legislature passed a Declaration of Neutrality which was violated many times soon after. Amongst such incursions, many wealthy residents at the time were rumored to bury their savings, to prevent it from being confiscated by the Confederates. Such significant caches alleged to be hidden included $80,000 worth of gold by resident William Pettit of Lexington (equivalent to $2,091,892 in 2025), along with James Langstaff, who wrote a letter mentioning a cache worth $20,000 in Paducah (equivalent to $522,973 in 2025).

Ryan McNutt, a conflict archaeologist from Georgia Southern University opined that, based on the dating of the hoard, the cache was buried in advance of Morgan's Raid, a major offensive through Kentucky into the Midwest by Confederate general John Hunt Morgan in June–July 1863, concurrent to that of Gettysburg and Vicksburg.

== Authentication and composition ==
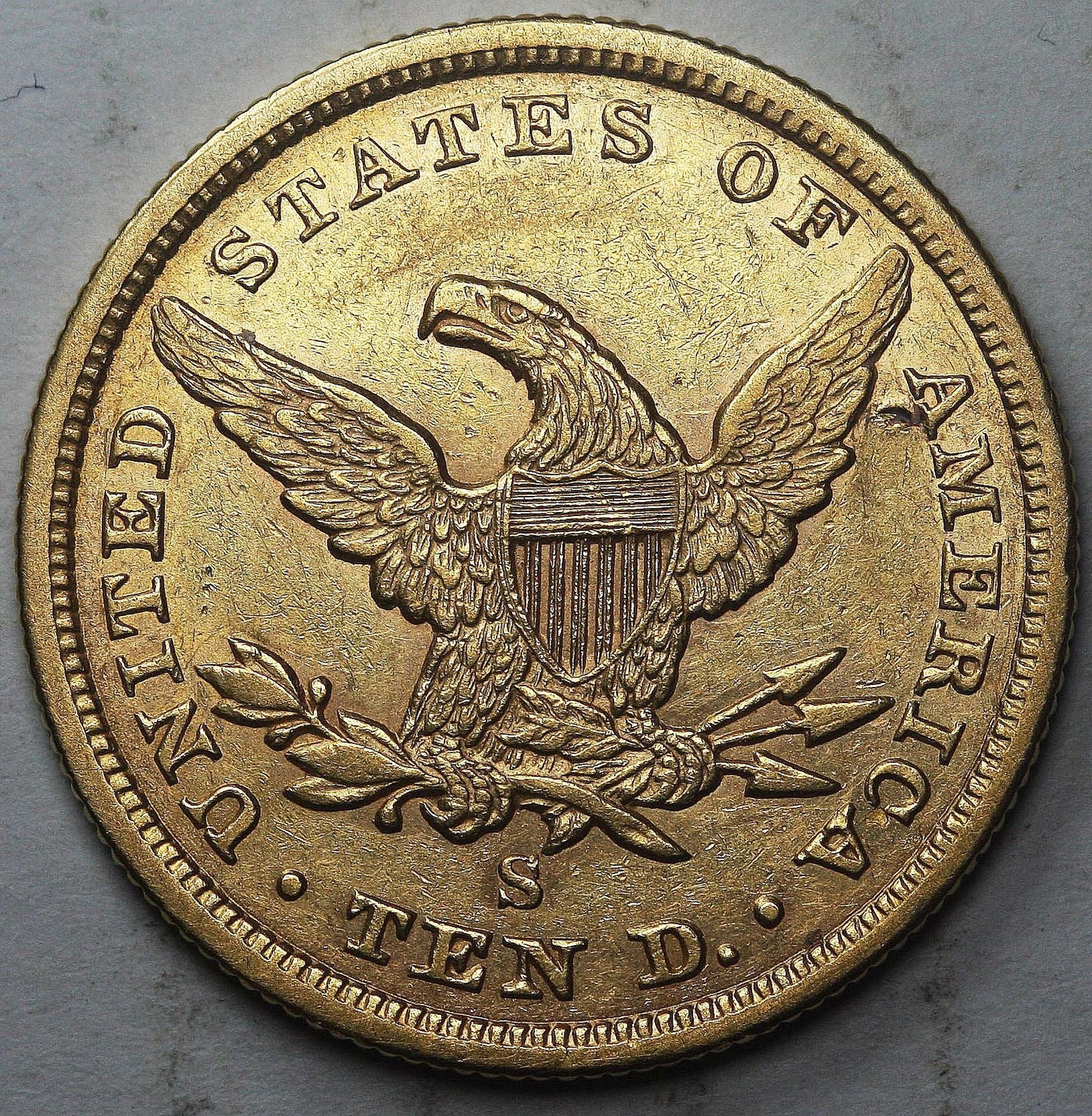
An 1856 Liberty Head Eagle ($10); twenty coins of this type were found in the Great Kentucky Hoard.

Ninety-five percent of the cache consists of gold dollars consisting of Type I, Type II, and Type III variants from 1854 to 1862. Twenty Liberty Head eagles ($10) were identified to date from 1840 to 1862, along with 8 Liberty Head double eagles ($20) dating from 1857 to 1862. The dating of the hoard is from a set of eighteen 1863 Double Eagles, made in the Philadelphia Mint.

Variants of the circulating coins include three 1862 doubled die Dollar variants dubbed FS-101. It was noted that the 1861 dollars had medallic alignment imperfections, and a new 1862 error (two specimens), where the date was re-punched twice, which was then dubbed variant VP-002 by the Numismatic Guaranty Company (NGC).

Following the discovery, NGC slabbed the pieces with a specific label tracing the coins back to the hoard. The hoard was publicized through the certification of the coins through the NGC and subsequently sold by the website GOVMINT.

== Legacy ==
The discovery of this cache is significant as the latest pieces dated to 1863, the height of the American Civil War, and as such, is one such physical evidence of lost Civil War gold that permeates American pop culture.

== See also ==
- Baltimore Gold Hoard
- Kentucky in the American Civil War
- List of hoards in North America
- Saddle Ridge Hoard
