= Baltimore Gold Hoard =

1934 discovery of gold coins in Maryland

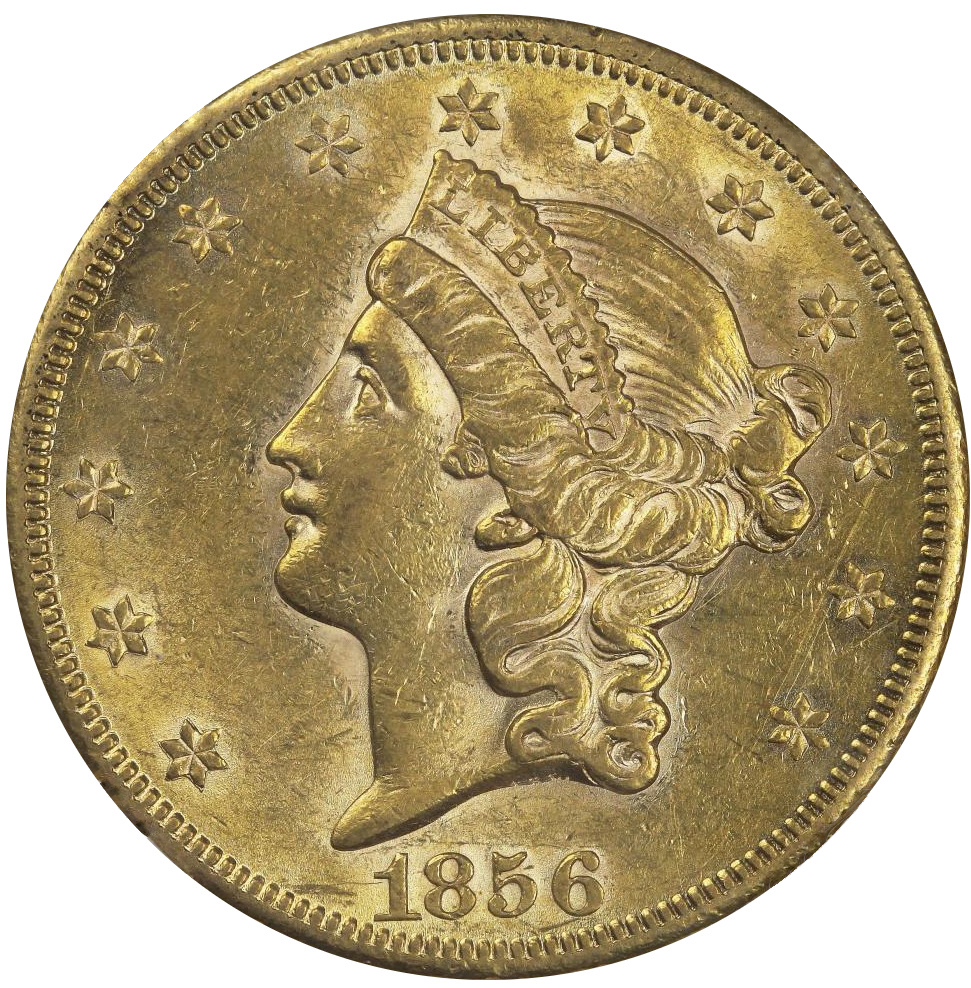
An 1856-O double eagle, similar to the one depicted here, was the most expensive coin in the hoard, selling at auction for $105 (equivalent to $2,527 in 2025)

In 1934, a hoard of gold coins was discovered by two teenage boys (Theodore Jones, 16, and Henry Grob, 15) in Baltimore, Maryland. The two boys discovered copper pots containing 3,558 gold coins while digging in the dirt of a cellar. One year later the two boys discovered a second hoard in the same location. The total value of both hoards was US$30,000 (equivalent to $722,015 in 2025).

The boys were unable to keep the gold due to the Gold Reserve Act of 1934 which made private ownership of gold illegal. They subsequently turned the gold over to the police. After the discovery was revealed, a legal battle ensued with approximately one dozen claimants. In 1935 the boys were awarded the gold which would be held until they turned 21. The decision was appealed and in 1937 the boys were again awarded the money which came to $7,000 each, (equivalent to $168,470 in 2025) after court costs and attorney fees.

In 1935 while awaiting the ruling in their case they again dug in the cellar and this time they found another gold hoard worth $10,000 (equivalent to $240,672 in 2025). They divided the second hoard and turned it over to their mothers. The two boys kept the second gold discovery secret until a burglary of the Jones' home later that year. Newspapers reported that it was stolen from a locked trunk in the home.

== Background ==
On August 31, 1934, Theodore Jones, 16, and Henry Grob, 15, were digging in the cellar of an Eden Street tenement where Jones and his mother resided in Baltimore, Maryland. The two boys had formed a club and they intended to create a hiding place for dues that they planned to collect. While digging they struck a hard object. The owners of the property were Elizabeth H. French and Mary P. B. Findlay.

== History ==
Jones and Grob found 3,558 gold coins in two copper pots in the cellar of Jones' house. The hoard consisted of $1, $2.50, $5, $10 and $20 gold coins from the 1830s, 1840s and 1850s. The two boys were without fathers and on government assistance. Because the gold was discovered in 1934, the 1933 U.S. Gold Act required them to turn the gold in to the U.S. government. The hoard contained 317 $20 gold pieces, 81 $10s, 255 $5s, 65 $2.50s and 2,840 $1s. In 1934 the two posed for a photo with their discovery and stated that they wished to help their mothers with the money. The two boys offered the owners of the home one quarter of the find, but the owners demanded half. After legal battles the courts ruled that the property owners were not entitled to any portion of the find.

=== Second discovery ===
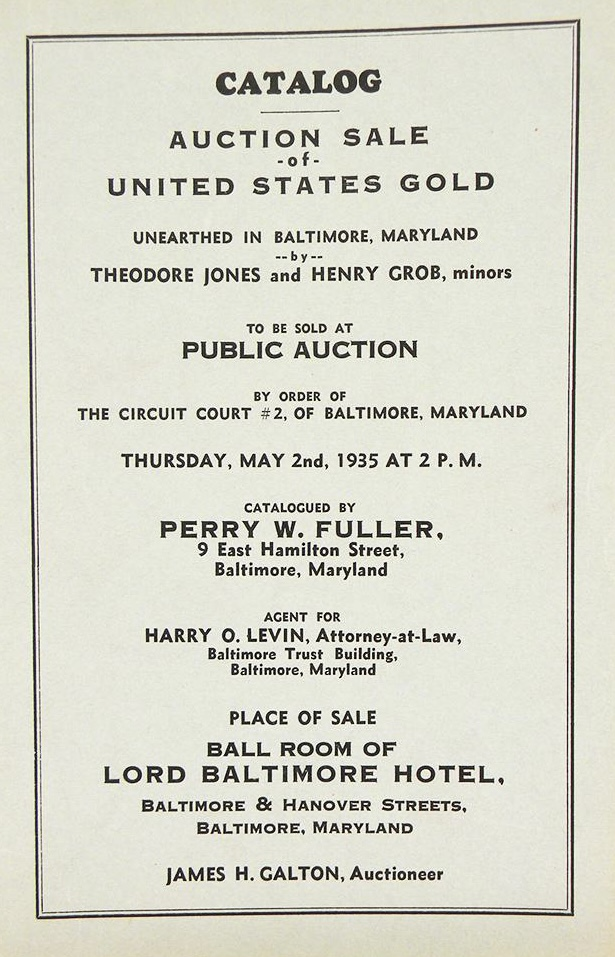
Baltimore gold hoard auction catalog cover (1935)

In 1935 the two boys decided to dig in the cellar again and they discovered another hoard of gold coins. The estimated value of the second hoard was $10,000 (equivalent to $240,672 in 2025). The two boys divided the coins and turned their shares over to their mothers. Grob's mother sold her share for $3,400. The total value of the 1934 and 1935 hoards was $30,000 (equivalent to $722,015 in 2025). Henry Grob claimed that he was advised to keep the gold from the second discovery and say nothing.

On September 2, 1935, a window on the Jones' apartment was forced open near a fire escape. The home was ransacked and a lock on a trunk was broken. The coins and money from the second discovery were reportedly stolen: $5,000 in gold and $3,100 in cash were taken from a trunk on the second floor. Henry Grob's stepfather Philip A. Rummel claimed that his life savings were in the trunk.

== Legal disposition ==
When news got out about the hoard, approximately one dozen people claimed the gold. There were numerous legal proceedings with the other parties claiming that the gold was theirs. Judge O'Dunne heard the case and dismissed all of the claimants except the boys. In 1935, the coins were sold at auction for a total of $20,000. The coins were auctioned by Baltimore dealer Harry W. Fuller and collectors paid more than face value for the coins. The two boys attended the auction and sat in the back row.

The 1935 decision awarding the coins to the two boys was appealed and the case was not settled until 1937. The two boys each were awarded $10,000 ($7,000 after court costs and attorney fees) (equivalent to $168,470 in 2025) which would become available to them when they turned 21.

Henry Grob never collected his share of the find because he died while litigation over possession of the gold was ongoing. He had been working in a packing house for US$16 and contracted pneumonia. He was admitted to South Baltimore General Hospital for a week and died of pneumonia on August 25, 1937.

There was a court battle over the second gold hoard initiated by the property owners. Judge Dennis heard the second case and decided that the boys were entitled to the money from the second discovery because "Conditions surrounding the two finds were not different enough to warrant giving the second to the property owners."

== See also ==
- List of hoards in North America
- Great Kentucky Hoard
