= Saddle Ridge Hoard =

Gold coins unearthed in California

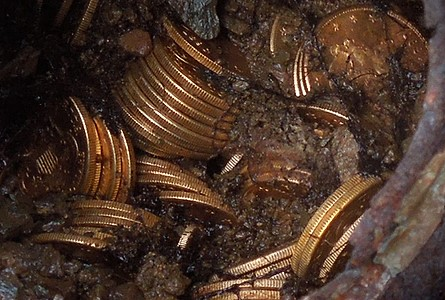
- Gold coins in situ
- Material: Gold coins
- Size: 1,427 coins
- Created: 1847 to 1894
- Discovered: Northern California in February 2013
- Present location: Tiburon, California

The Saddle Ridge Hoard is the name given to a hoard of 1,427 gold coins unearthed in Northern California in 2013. The face value of the coins totaled $27,980, but was assessed to be worth $10 million. The hoard contained $27,460 in twenty-dollar coins, $500 in ten-dollar coins, and $20 in five-dollar coins, all dating from 1847 to 1894. The collection is the largest known discovery of buried gold coins that has ever been recovered in the United States.

== Discovery and excavation ==
The Saddle Ridge Hoard was discovered in February 2013 on private property located in Northern California. Due to privacy concerns, the exact location of the discovery has not been disclosed, other than to confirm that the land is located in a hillside area less than 200 miles (320 km) from the site of the Gold Rush of 1849. As of 2014, the couple who discovered the hoard have chosen to remain anonymous. Known only as John and Mary, the couple had lived on the approximately 200-acre rural property for several years and have no idea who buried the coins. They wish to keep their identity, location, and ownership history of the property private, in order to keep treasure seekers from trespassing on the property in an effort to find more gold.

The owners of the property discovered the trove while they were walking their dog on their property. Although they had reportedly hiked the trail numerous times previously, it was not until they spotted a rust-covered metal can poking out of the ground that they chose to explore further.

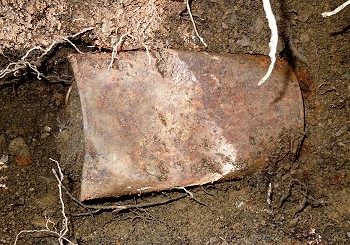
Rusted can of gold coins as found at discovery site in February 2013

Before finding the trove, the couple had noticed some unique features of the area. They recalled seeing an old empty can hanging from an old tree. The can had evidently been there so long that the tree had grown around it. At the time, the couple surmised that the hanging can had possibly been used to hold flowers and mark a grave. They also noticed an oddly shaped rock on the nearby hill, which they nicknamed "Saddle Ridge". After they found the gold, they realized that the geographical features and the hanging can were probably markers to the site, placed by the original owners. The center of the treasure trove was located ten steps from the jagged rock in the direction of the North Star.

After Mary noticed the can, John bent down to pick it up, but found that it was stuck in the dirt. He began to use a piece of wood to pry it from the ground. It was so heavy that they believed that the can likely held lead paint. On their walk back to their house, struggling to carry the weight of the find, the lid of the can cracked open, revealing the edge of a single gold coin. They returned to the site with some hand tools to see if they could find anything else. They found another can about a foot away from where the first can was discovered. Although it was partially decomposed due to rust, it held several more coins. They continued to return to the site to look for more coins, primarily digging in the ground and eventually using a metal detector. Their work eventually resulted in the discovery of eight cans filled with 1,427 coins.

After their discovery, the couple protected their find by hiding it in an old ice chest, then burying it under a pile of wood and concealing the location. After some initial research, they contacted the numismatics firm of Kagin's in Tiburon, California, which is representing the owners.

== Authentication and valuation ==
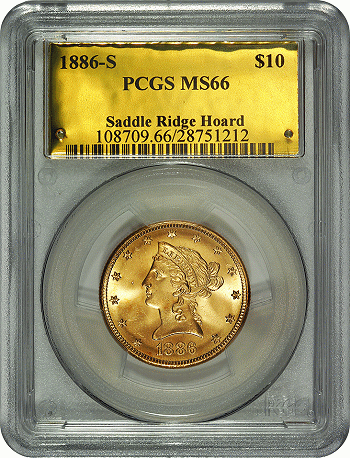
1886-S $10 PCGS coin slab

Numismatist David J. McCarthy of the California firm Kagin's completed the initial evaluation of the coins and assessed the significance of the find. Prior to the discovery of the hoard, the largest buried collection of gold found in the US was uncovered by city workers in Jackson, Tennessee, in 1985. The Jackson hoard had a face value of $4,500 and sold for about $1 million (not adjusted for inflation). The face value of the Saddle Ridge treasure is $27,980. The discovery raises interesting questions about its finders' tax liability, due to the Treasury Department regulation which states that “Treasure trove, to the extent of its value in United States currency, constitutes gross income for the taxable year in which it is reduced to undisputed possession.”

Following the initial assessment, McCarthy and Kagin's were contracted to conserve the material. Kagin's then contacted the Professional Coin Grading Service (PCGS) of Irvine, California for an independent authentication. PCGS reported that many of the coins were recovered in uncirculated, mint condition. It further stated that some of the pieces are so rare that they could be worth about $1 million each. The coin grading and certification revealed that over a dozen of the coins are either the finest known or tied for the finest known specimens in the PCGS Population Report. The collection includes:

- 1866-S $20 Double Eagle/no motto valued at around $1 million
- 1866-S $20 Double Eagle/with motto PCGS MS62+ (finest known)
- 1877-S $20 Double Eagle PCGS MS65 (tied finest known)
- 1888-S $20 Double Eagle (four) PCGS MS64 (tied for finest known)
- 1889-S $20 Double Eagle (two) graded PCGS MS65 (tied for finest known)
- 1894-S $20 Double Eagle PCGS MS65 (tied for finest known)

== Disposition ==
According to Donald Kagin, Kagin's has an exclusive arrangement with Amazon.com to sell the coins through their collectibles store. This arrangement is the first major sale of coins made through Amazon. John and Mary have also chosen to use the funds to cover their personal debt and donate to several local charities. They have additionally chosen to retain some of the coins for family heirlooms and keepsakes.

== Origination theories ==
Following the initial discovery of the coins, there was widespread speculation that the hoard represented the discovery of the 1901 theft of $30,000 (~$925,694 in 2025) from the San Francisco Mint by employee Walter Dimmick. Kagin's and the U.S. Mint ruled out this theory, stating that the Saddle Ridge Hoard is unlikely to be part of the mint heist, due to the diversity in the face value and condition of the coins. On March 4, 2014, the U.S. Mint stated that "[they] do not have any information linking the Saddle Ridge Hoard coins to any thefts at any United States Mint facility", and "[they've] done quite a bit of research, and we've got a crack team of lawyers, and trust me, if this was U.S. government property we'd be going after it."

Other disregarded theories contend that the hoard is a hidden stash of gold buried by Jesse James, or loot taken by Black Bart, who was known for robbing stagecoaches. A theory has also been advanced that the hoard was part of a treasure supposedly hidden by the Knights of the Golden Circle, to be used to fund a second Civil War. The predominant theory attributes the cache to an unknown individual who chose to bury the coins rather than trust the banks to protect his wealth. While the couple who found the coins have remained anonymous and the location of the find is undisclosed, several individuals have attempted to claim the gold coins or a share of the profits, asserting that the money belonged to one of their relatives or associates.

== See also ==
- Great Kentucky Hoard – a cache of over 700 gold coins, consisting of Gold dollars, Eagles, and Double Eagles discovered on farmland in Kentucky in 2023
- List of hoards in North America
