= List of hoards in North America =

This is a list of hoards (buried treasure caches) that were unearthed in North America. "Unearthed" usually means they were found buried in the ground but some are hidden by other means.

- Baltimore gold hoard
- Bank of New York Hoard
- Castine Hoard
- Dawson Film Find
- Great Kentucky Hoard
- Saddle Ridge Hoard
- Wulfing cache
