= Liberty Head double eagle =

American twenty-dollar gold piece

Liberty Head double eagle ($20)
- United States
- Value: 20 United States dollars
- Mass: 33.431 g
- Diameter: 34.1 mm (1.342 in)
- Thickness: 2.41 mm
- Edge: reeded
- Composition: 90% gold, 10% copper
- Gold: .96750 troy oz
- Years of minting: 1849 (pattern only); 1850–1907 (regular issues)
- Mint marks: CC, D, O, S. Found immediately below the eagle on the reverse. Philadelphia Mint specimens lack mint mark.

Obverse
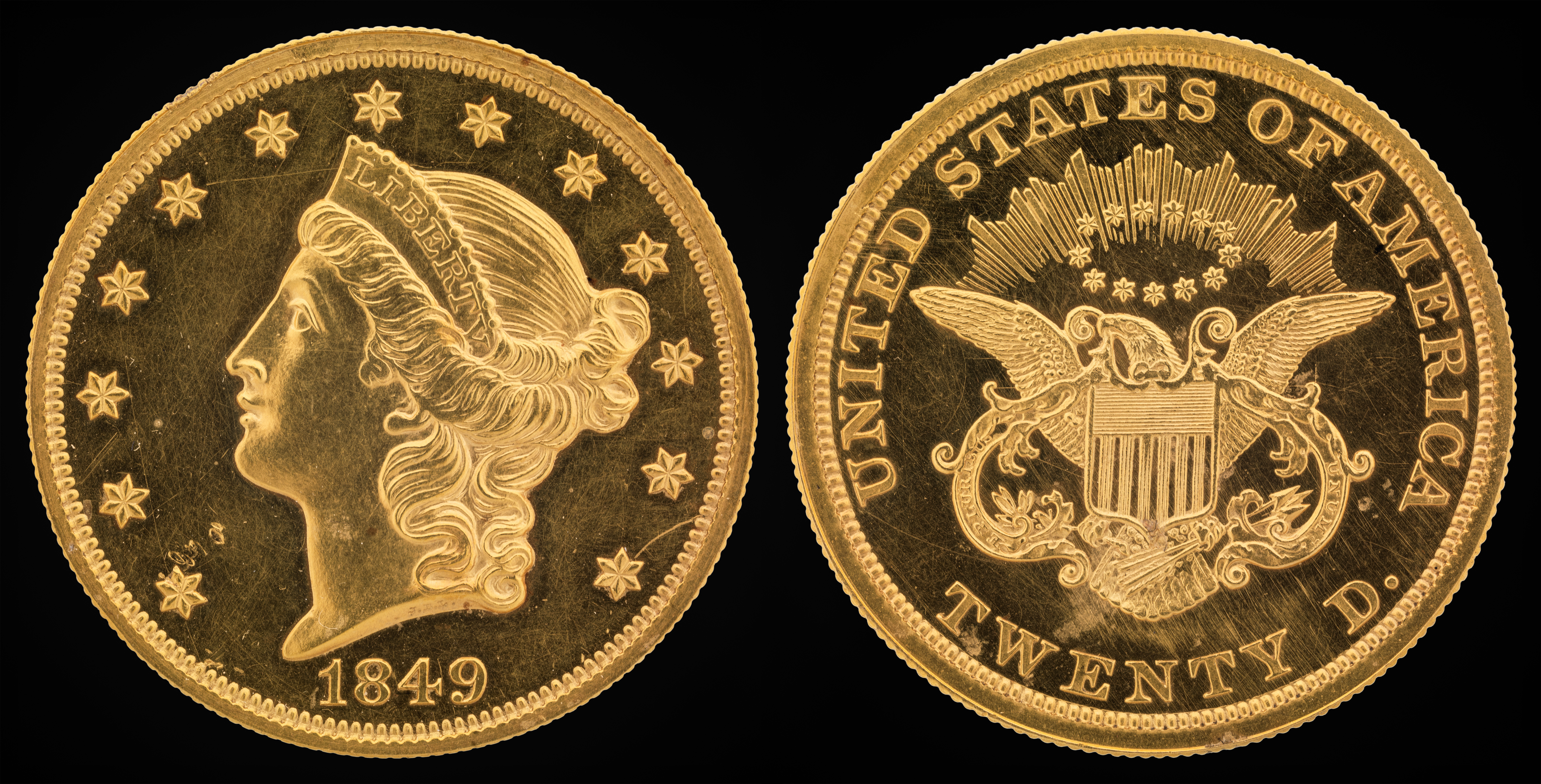
- Design: Head of Liberty
- Designer: James B. Longacre
- Design date: 1849
- Design discontinued: 1907

Reverse
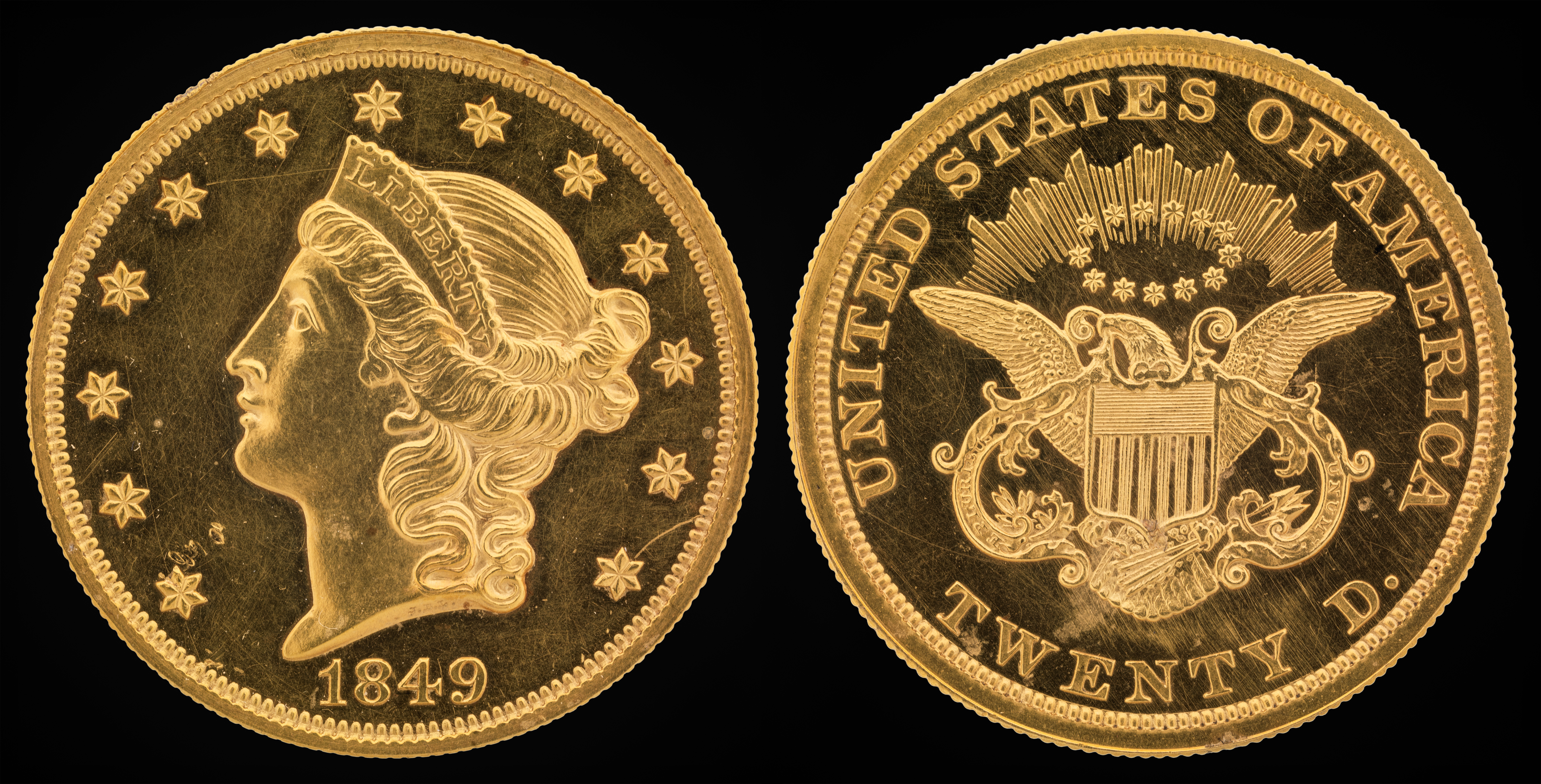
- Design: Heraldic eagle. Type I
- Designer: James B. Longacre
- Design date: 1849
- Design discontinued: 1866
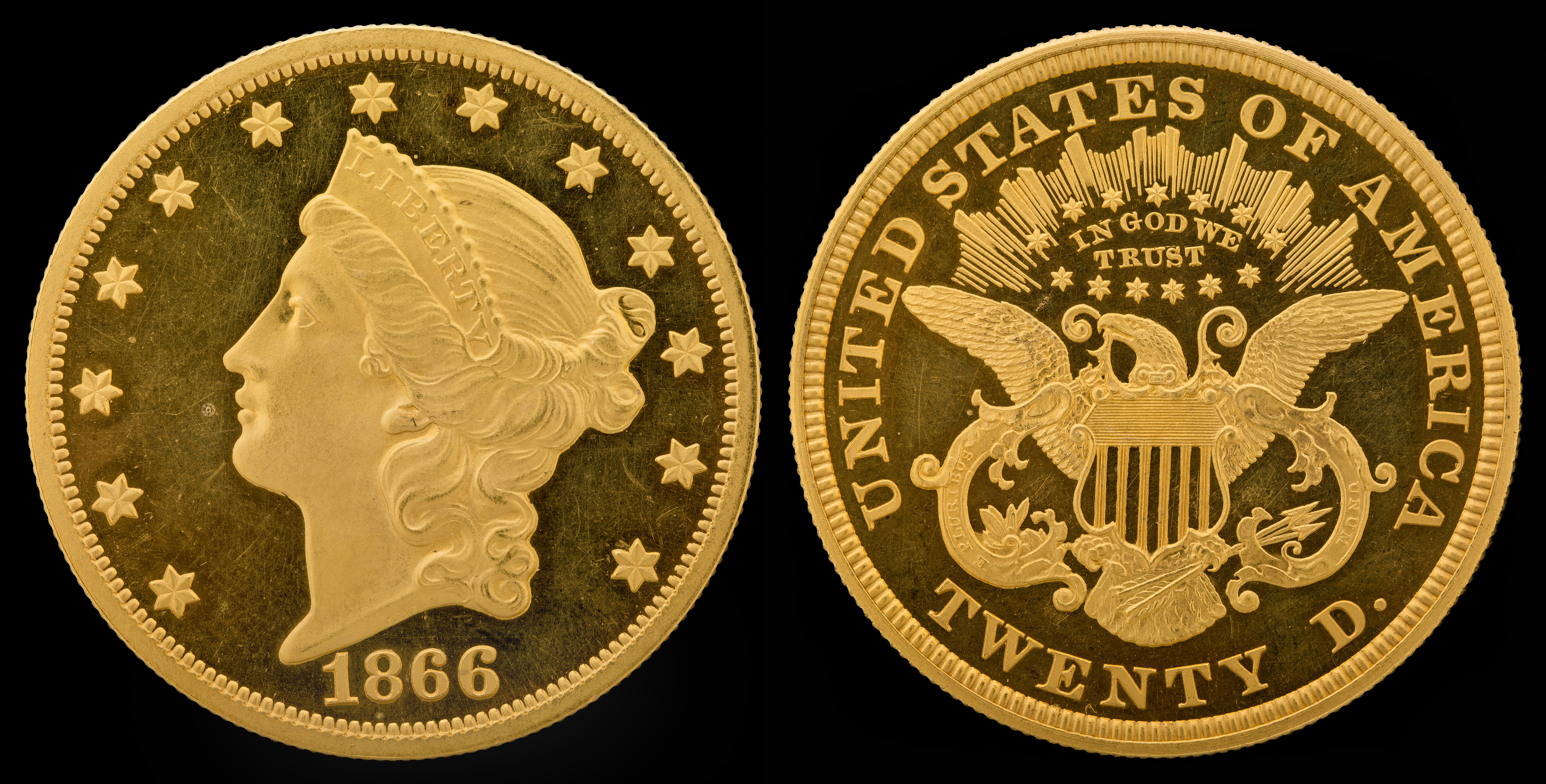
- Design: Type II, with "In God We Trust"
- Designer: James B. Longacre
- Design date: 1866
- Design discontinued: 1876
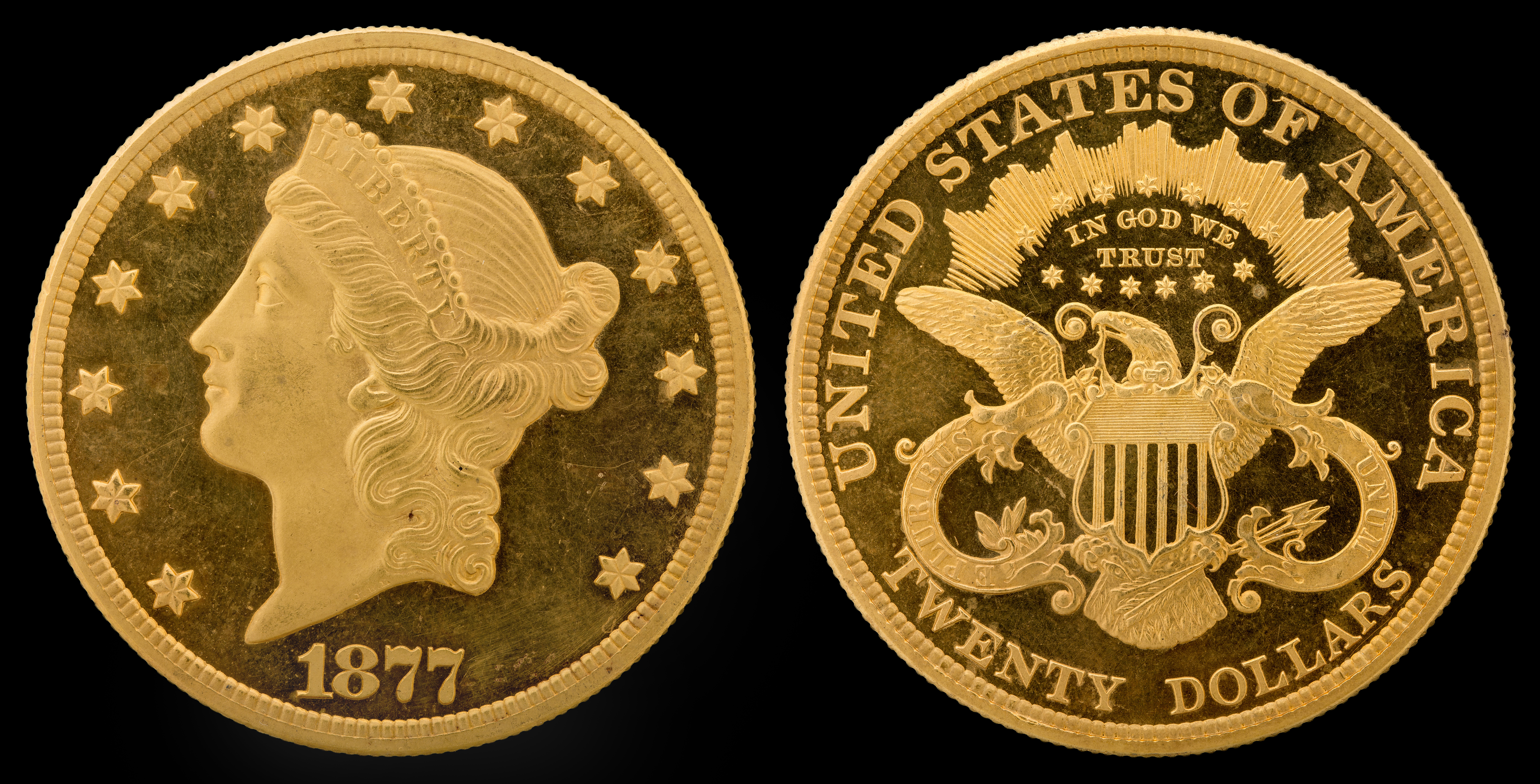
- Design: Type III, with "Dollars" spelled out
- Designer: James B. Longacre
- Design date: 1877
- Design discontinued: 1907

The Liberty Head double eagle or Coronet double eagle is an American twenty-dollar gold piece struck as a pattern coin in 1849, and for commerce from 1850 to 1907. It was designed by Mint of the United States Chief Engraver James B. Longacre.

The largest denomination of United States coin authorized by the Mint Act of 1792 was the eagle, or ten-dollar piece. The large amount of bullion being brought east after the discovery of gold in California in the 1840s caused Congress to consider new denominations of gold coinage. The gold dollar and double eagle were the result. After considerable infighting at the Philadelphia Mint, Chief Engraver James B. Longacre designed the double eagle, and it began to be issued for commerce in 1850. Only one 1849 double eagle is known to survive and it rests in the National Numismatic Collection at the Smithsonian.

The coin was immediately successful; merchants and banks used it in trade. It was struck until replaced by the Saint-Gaudens double eagle in 1907, and many were melted when President Franklin D. Roosevelt recalled gold coins from the public in 1933. Millions of double eagles were sent overseas in international transactions throughout its run to be melted or placed in bank vaults. Many of the latter have now been repatriated to feed the demand from collectors and those who desire to hold gold.

== Inception ==
Under the Mint Act of 1792, the largest-denomination coin was the gold eagle, or ten-dollar piece. Also struck were a half eagle ($5) and quarter eagle ($2.50). Bullion flowed out of the United States for economic reasons for much of the late 18th and early 19th centuries. The eagle's size made it convenient for use in international transactions, and, faced with the likelihood that most being struck were exported, the Director of the Mint Elias Boudinot ended its production in 1804. In 1838, coinage resumed after Congress revised the weight and fineness of American gold coins. The new eagle was struck to a design by Christian Gobrecht, who was one of the Mint's engravers.

In 1836, the Public Ledger, a Philadelphia newspaper, proposed the issuance of both a gold dollar and a twenty-dollar piece; they wrote of the latter, "Twenty [silver dollars] are an encumbrance in a pocket ... if we are to have larger coins, let them be of gold. Along with the eagle, which has the size of the half dollar, we would recommend the double eagle, which [would be] of the size of our silver dollar, [and] would contain the value of twenty." Others perceived a need for a large U.S. gold coin to be used in international transactions—American merchants sometimes used high-denomination Latin American gold coins for that purpose.

No proposal for a gold twenty-dollar piece was considered until after the California Gold Rush, beginning in 1848, greatly increased the amount of the metal available in the United States. The increase in the supply of gold caused silver coins to be worth more than their face value, and they were heavily exported, generating new support for a gold dollar to take their place in commerce. The quantity of gold made a larger denomination desirable as well, to more efficiently convert gold to coins. In January 1849, North Carolina Congressman James Iver McKay amended his previously introduced legislation for a gold dollar to provide for a double eagle as well. He wrote to Mint Director Robert M. Patterson, who responded, "there can be no other objection to the Double eagle except that it is not needed. It will be a handsome coin, between the half dollar and dollar in size."

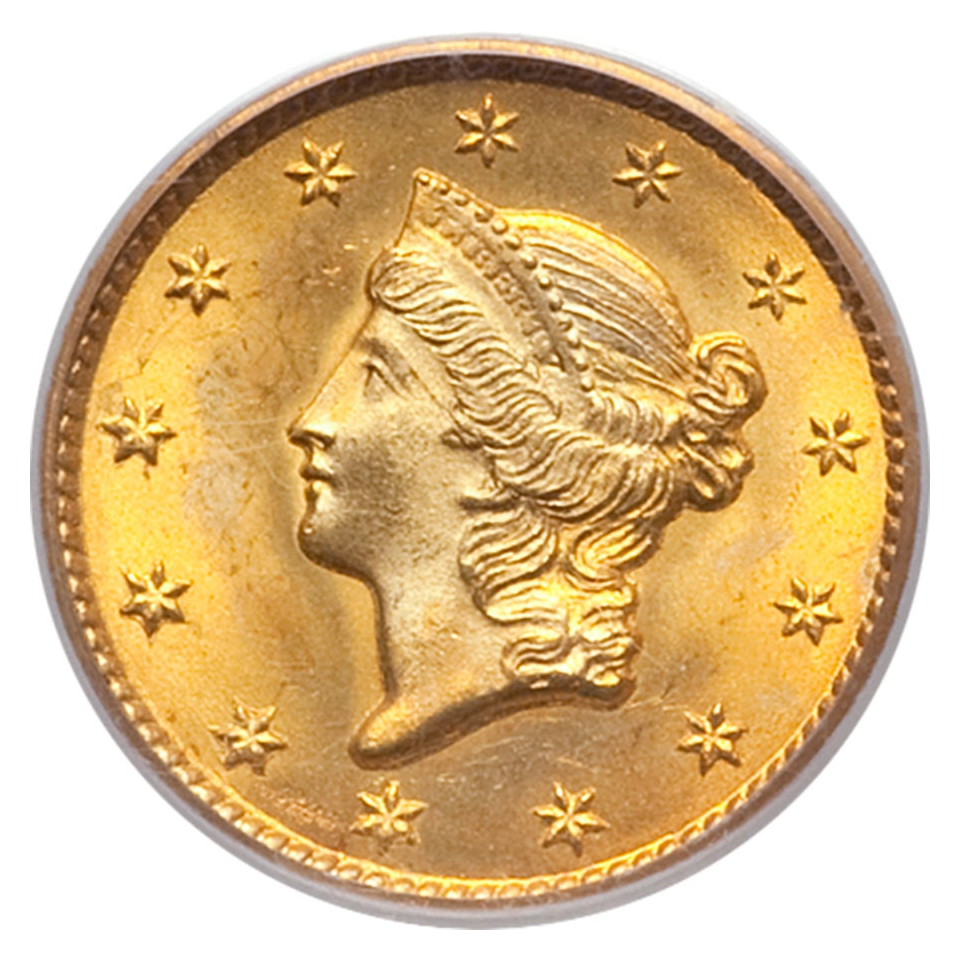
Longacre's design for the Type 1 obverse of the gold dollar is almost identical to his design for the Liberty Head double eagle, only lacking the year of issue, which is on the reverse instead.

Concerned about likely Whig opposition to the coinage bill, McKay got his fellow Democrat, New Hampshire Senator Charles Atherton, to introduce the bill in the Senate on February 1, 1849—Atherton was chairman of the Senate Finance Committee. McKay introduced a version of the bill into the House on February 20; debate began the same day. The dollar was attacked on the ground it would be too small; the double eagle on the claim that it would be heavily abraded in circulation, and would become lightweight. McKay did not respond substantively, but stated that if no one wanted these denominations, they would be unasked-for at the Mint, and would not be coined. Pennsylvania Representative Joseph Ingersoll, a Whig, spoke against the bill, noting that Patterson opposed the new denominations. Ingersoll stated that a twenty-dollar piece would be "doubled into a ponderous and unparalleled size". Nevertheless, the bill providing for the issuance of the gold dollar and double eagle passed both houses by large margins, and was signed into law by President James K. Polk on March 3, 1849. According to numismatist David Lange, "the double eagle was a banker's coin intended to simplify transfers of large sums between financial institutions and between nations".

== Preparation ==
The act authorizing the gold dollar and double eagle precipitated conflict at the Philadelphia Mint. There the officers, including Chief Coiner Franklin Peale, were mostly the friends and relations of Director Patterson. The outsider in their midst was Chief Engraver (Note: Formally, "Engraver to the United States Mint at Philadelphia"; he had no full-time assistant engravers then. The office came to be known as "Chief Engraver" later. See Bowers 2004, p. 25) James B. Longacre, successor to Gobrecht (who had died in 1844). A former copper-plate engraver, Longacre had been appointed through the political influence of South Carolina Senator John C. Calhoun. Patterson despised Calhoun, and Longacre became a loner at the mint. Most of Peale's formal duties were performed by his predecessor, Adam Eckfeldt, who continued to do the work of chief coiner despite his retirement. Peale spent the resulting free time running a private medal business taking commissions from the public and using the government's facilities, including its Contamin portrait lathe. This machine, used in Peale's medal work, was needed to reduce models of new designs to coin-sized reductions from which working dies could be made. So long as no new coin designs were needed, dies could be reproduced mechanically, without using the Contamin device. Although it belonged to his department, Longacre did not use the Contamin lathe much until Congress ordered that the two new coins be struck.

When Longacre began work on the two new coins in early 1849, he had no assistants. He completed work on the gold dollar first, anxious to show that he could create a coin design. In May, he requested that Patterson hire another engraver to assist him. The director declined, willing only to have engraving work contracted out. This was unsatisfactory to Longacre, who was responsible under the law for the proper execution of coinage dies, and who could not supervise outside work.

As Longacre worked on the double eagle design, according to numismatist Walter Breen, "Peale, with Patterson's tacit approval, began harassment." Longacre prepared a large model of the new coin in wax and was instructed to give it to Peale for use in preparing a metal galvano, which could be used in the lathe. The operation failed, and Longacre's model was destroyed. Longacre had, however, made a cast of his model in plaster, and was able to use it in the machine. The resulting steel die had to be hardened in Peale's department; as Longacre put it, "it unluckily split in the process". According to numismatic historian Don Taxay, "Peale's adoption of a process not normally used at the Mint, together with its catastrophic failures, seems more than coincidental".

Longacre set forth on a third attempt to create a die. He was hampered not only by the continued opposition of Peale but by poor lighting and the noxious fumes that penetrated his office at the Philadelphia Mint. A friend, New York engraver Charles Cushing Wright, arranged for Peter F. Cross to assist Longacre with making hubs and dies. Cross made the first obverse die in November and December 1849 at Longacre's direction, and the chief engraver made the reverse. On December 22, 1849, Patterson wrote to Treasury Secretary William M. Meredith that the dies were completed. He enclosed a double eagle, asking Meredith, if he approved of the piece, to send word as quickly as possible to allow the coinage of 1849 double eagles in quantity. Before any reply could be received, Peale objected on December 24, complaining that the relief of the head of Liberty was so high that pieces struck using the Philadelphia Mint's steam-powered machinery could not fully bring out the design—the coin sent to Meredith had been coined on a medal press, by hand. In addition, Peale alleged that the head was in such high relief that the coins would not stack. Patterson sent Peale's letter to Meredith on December 25, noting that this meant there would be a lengthy delay.

Longacre completed the lower-relief dies about January 12, 1850. Peale did not test them for two weeks; when he did, he rejected them, stating that Liberty's head opposed the eagle on the reverse, making it difficult for the full design to be brought forth. He stated that Longacre would have to move the position of the head. Longacre, outraged, appealed to Director Patterson, who took no action, but early the next month came to see Longacre in his office. He told the engraver that the Taylor administration (which had taken office in March 1849) had decided on Longacre's removal, and urged him to send in his resignation as quickly as possible. Longacre did not resign but went to Washington to see Secretary Meredith. He found that Patterson had lied to Meredith about a number of matters. For example, when Longacre took a new double eagle from his pocket, Meredith expressed surprise, believing that the dies from which it had been made had been broken. Longacre kept his job.

According to numismatic author Q. David Bowers, Longacre's last set of dies were completed in February 1850, and were accepted. Breen, however, stated that the first production coins appeared about January 26, 1850. Only one 1849 double eagle is known to be extant; it forms part of the Smithsonian Institution's National Numismatic Collection. The specimen sent to Meredith is unlocated, and is said to have been owned in the 1950s by coin dealer William K. Nagy, whose former business partner John W. Haseltine supposedly acquired it from the Meredith estate. Nagy allegedly stated that he had sold the coin to a private collector. One 1849 piece, in gilt brass, was later struck for Philadelphia druggist and numismatist Robert Coulton Davis, who had close ties to the Mint. Its location is also unknown.

== Design ==
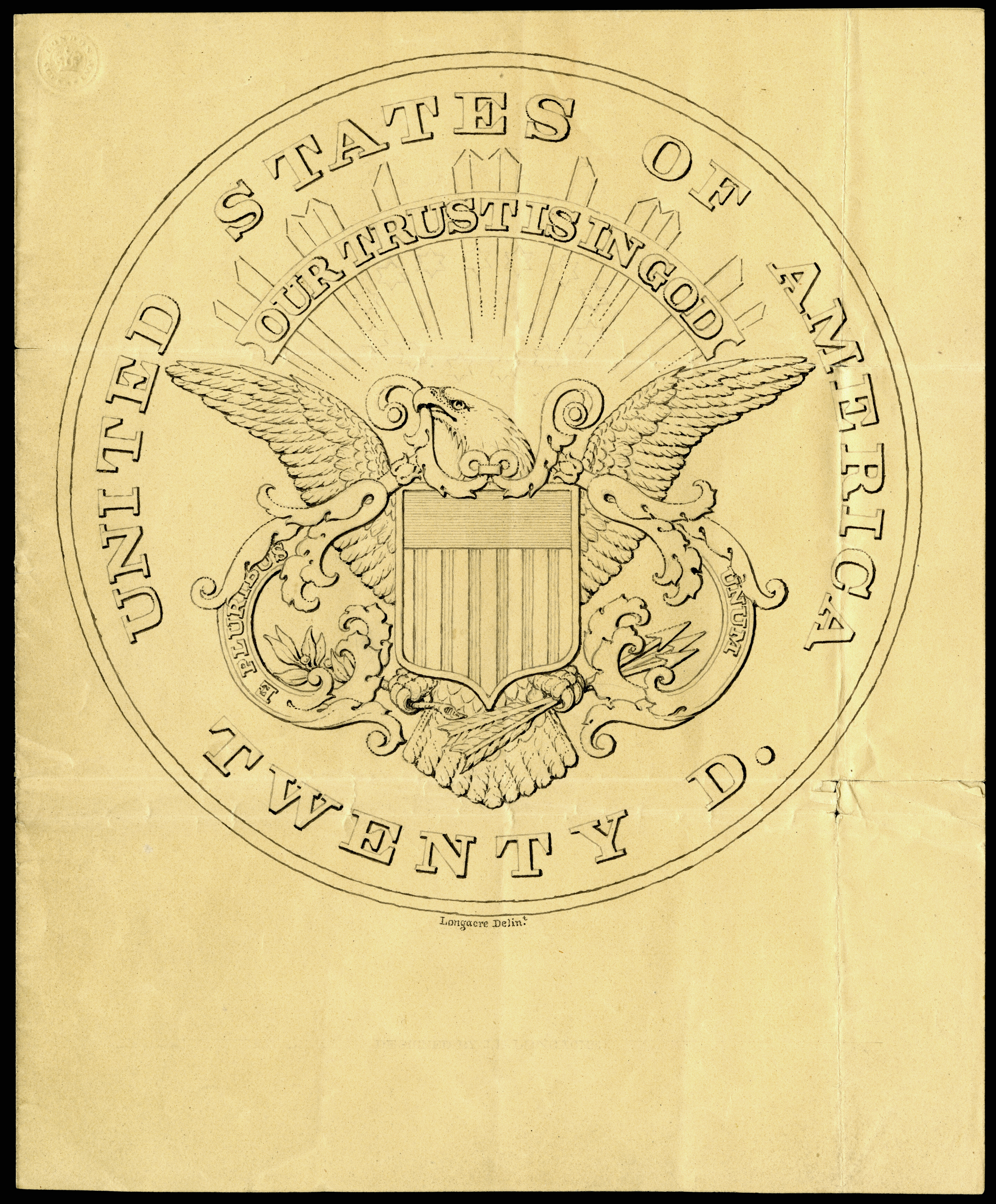
Hand-drawn design for the reverse of the $20 Liberty Head with a proposed (but not adopted) version of the motto.

The obverse depicts a head of Liberty in the Greco-Roman style, facing left, with her hair pulled back—according to numismatists Jeff Garrett and Ron Guth, "attractively"—in a bun. Some of her hair descends the back of her neck. She wears a coronet, inscribed "Liberty", and is surrounded by thirteen stars, representative of the original states, and the year of issue. The reverse features a heraldic eagle, holding a double ribbon, on which "E Pluribus Unum" is inscribed. The double ribbon is an allusion by Longacre to the denomination of the piece he was designing. The design is a variant on the Great Seal of the United States; the eagle protects a shield, which represents the nation, and holds an olive branch and arrows. Above the bird, Longacre again placed thirteen stars, arranged as a halo, together with an arc of rays.

Longacre's initials, JBL, appear on the truncation of the head. The gold dollar and twenty-dollar piece were the first American federal coins on which the designer's initials appear—on the gold dollar, only the "L" is used. Longacre's designs for the double eagle and the Type I gold dollar (1849–1854) are similar.

Art historian Cornelius Vermeule disliked the double eagle and other Longacre coins showing Liberty, calling them routine. He did find that the reverse "has some commendable points of heraldic imagery" and likened that side of the coin to "the frontispiece for a patriotic brochure". The Daily Alta California in May 1850 reprinted a piece from an unnamed Eastern newspaper, which said of the new piece, "we cannot say that we admire it ... [the eagle on the reverse is] imperfectly formed, and marred by some adjacent flummery intended for radiance we suppose, by which the whole thing is rendered confused". The Journal of Commerce, a New York periodical, suggested that the piece be replaced with one showing George Washington on one side and on the other "a handsome eagle standing out as if it were not ashamed of itself". The Boston Evening Transcript suggested that Mint authorities should be "stopping the issuance of this very shabby coin. The manager of the mint would seem to be utterly destitute of taste to allow such a specimen to go forth." Bowers, writing in 2004, stated that despite the negative contemporary reaction, the design of the double eagle is now very popular among collectors.

== Production ==
=== Type I (1850–1866) ===
The double eagle soon became the most popular gold coin in terms of the number of pieces struck. During the denomination's life, from 1850 to 1933, far more gold was struck into double eagles than into all other denominations combined. Of all gold coins struck from the start of gold coinage for circulation in 1795 to the end in 1933, just under half of the coins struck were double eagles, but 78% of the gold used was struck into twenty-dollar pieces. According to Bowers, the double eagle "represented the most efficient way to coin a given quantity of gold bullion into coin form".

Regular production of the double eagle began with the striking of just over a million at Philadelphia in 1850, and 141,000 at the New Orleans Mint that year. Double eagles were struck at New Orleans every year from 1850 to 1861, generally in small quantities. In the early years of the Liberty Head double eagle, when no mint was in the Far West, some California gold was presented there for coining into double eagles. Once the San Francisco Mint opened in 1854, New Orleans mintages were light as for the most part only local gold was deposited, and there was not much of it. The Philadelphia Mint continued to receive much of the California gold. After Louisiana seceded from the Union in 1861, some of the double eagles from New Orleans that year, though bearing the standard designs, were struck under the authority of the State of Louisiana, and later, the Confederacy. That mint then closed, reopening in 1879. The branch mints at Charlotte and Dahlonega, which also closed with the Civil War, had limited coinage facilities, and struck no denomination higher than a half eagle.

A shortage of gold coins occurred in California and the Far West in the early 1850s; federal authorities refused to accept gold dust for payment of customs duties and private minters soon stepped into the breach. California Senator William Gwin proposed legislation to establish assay offices in California and for the issuance of high-denomination gold coins, as large as $10,000. Although most of his proposals were defeated, an assay office was established at San Francisco. Nevertheless, two waves of panic related to money roiled California, and in 1852, Congress established the San Francisco Mint. The first double eagle was coined there on April 3, 1854; struck in proof condition, that piece is now part of the National Numismatic Collection. Just over half of the double eagles struck between 1850 and 1933 were minted at San Francisco.

Many of the high-grade San Francisco Type I double eagles known today were taken from shipwrecks, where they had rested for over a century. These ships included the SS Brother Jonathan, the SS Central America, and the SS Yankee Blade. Thousands of almost-pristine 1857 double eagles struck at San Francisco (1857-S) went down with the Central America when it sank off the East Coast of the United States that September, as did some 435 people, including Captain William Herndon. The cargo was salvaged beginning in the 1980s; once litigation over its ownership was settled, the pieces were marketed to the public. The Brother Jonathan, a luxurious paddle steamer en route from San Francisco north to Portland, sank in July 1865; few survived the wreck. The thousands of double eagles and other coins on board were salvaged beginning in 1996, and once litigation concluded, many mint state double eagles came on the market.

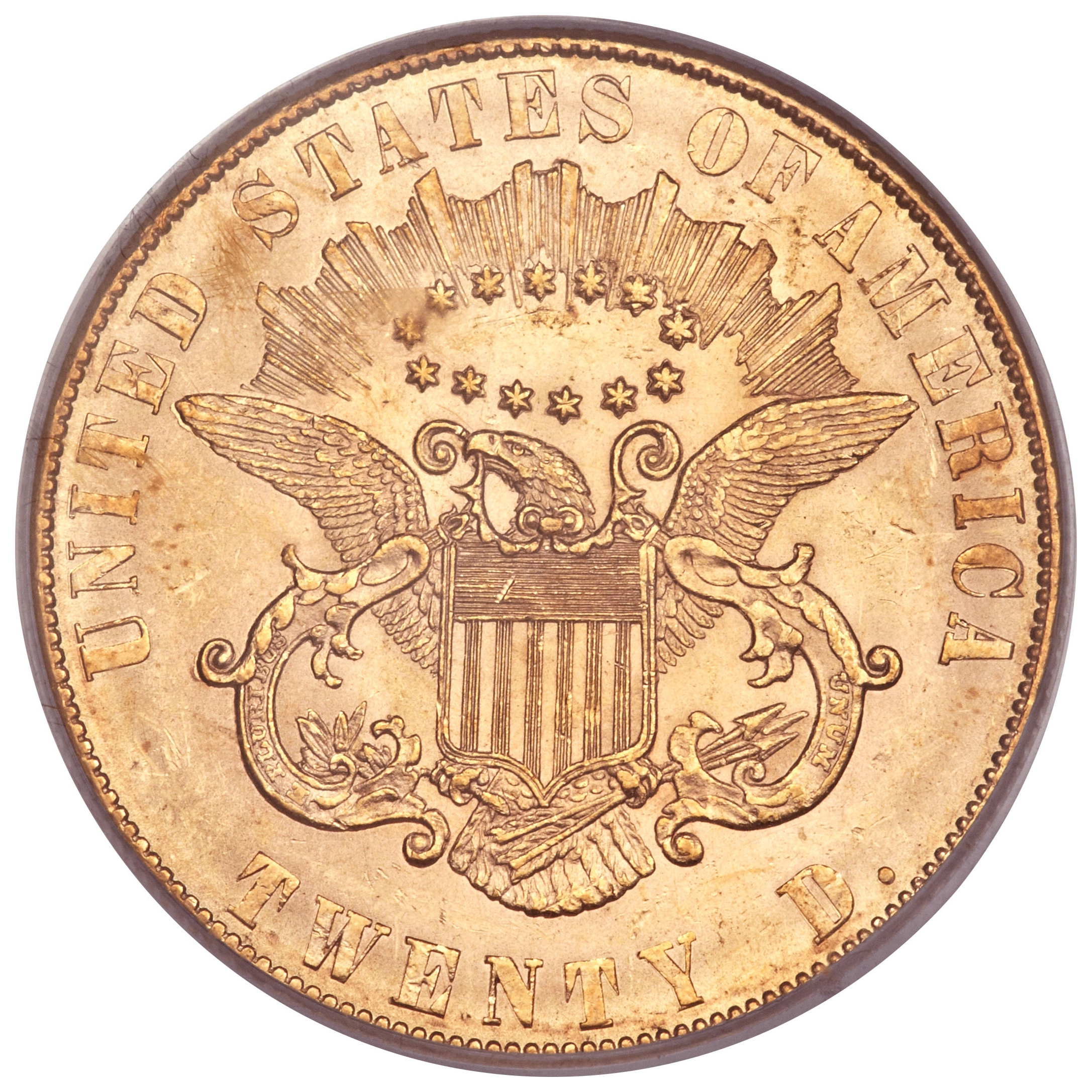
The 1861 Paquet reverse

The word "LIBERTY" on double eagles between 1850 and 1858 was originally spelled "LLBERTY" by Longacre, who converted the second L into an I; this is visible under magnification. In 1860, Assistant Engraver Anthony C. Paquet completed a revision of the reverse, with taller, narrower letters. After production had begun in early 1861 at Philadelphia and San Francisco, it was noticed that the design lacked a rim high enough to protect the design from abrasion, and the Mint went back to the old reverse. Only a handful of the Philadelphia specimens were not melted, but by the time word reached San Francisco to stop production, the western mint had issued 20,000 pieces. A Philadelphia specimen sold at auction for $1,610,000 in August 2006, setting a record for the Liberty Head double eagle series. In February 2013, an 1866-S double eagle with no motto was discovered in the Saddle Ridge Hoard in the Gold Country on the western slope of the Sierra Nevada in California. Only a very small number of proof coins in the Liberty Head double eagle series were struck for sale to the public, beginning in 1858, at Philadelphia; Breen noted, "few collectors could afford them even then".

=== Type II (1866–1876) ===
With the nation in the midst of an internal war, in November 1861, Secretary of the Treasury Salmon P. Chase received a proposal that American coinage bear an expression of faith in God. After various wordings were considered, "In God We Trust" was placed on the new two-cent piece in 1864. The Act of March 3, 1865, that authorized the copper-nickel three-cent piece also required the motto to appear on all coins large enough to bear it. Pursuant to this mandate, Longacre began re-engraving the various denominations of U.S. coinage. In 1866, he added "In God We Trust" to all coins that did not already have it, excepting the pieces smaller in diameter than the nickel, a coin which began to be struck that year. The San Francisco Mint used up leftover double eagle reverse dies from 1865 before switching over during 1866.

Longacre made the required addition to the double eagle by slightly enlarging the circle of stars on the reverse, and placing the motto within it. He took the opportunity to make other changes to the double eagle. The shield on the reverse was given rococo sides; previously they had been straight. A ninth leaf was added to the olive branch, and the shape of the leaves was changed. The finials of the scroll were made smaller though more elaborate—on the left-hand scroll, the finials impinge less on the letters "ibus" in "Pluribus" than before. The eagle's wings and tail feathers were also slightly elongated.

In 1870, the Carson City Mint opened in Nevada at the urging of silver mining interests, so that ore could be refined and converted to coin locally. In addition to silver, it struck gold half eagles, eagles, and double eagles. The 1870-CC double eagle, like other coins from that mint's first year of operations, is a great rarity—only 3,789 were struck. One sold for $414,000 at auction in March 2009. Carson City double eagles circulated for the most part only locally, since they were only struck in response to the deposit of gold bullion and the request of the depositor that it be coined into twenty-dollar pieces. Heavy production of the coin occurred in San Francisco and satisfied the needs of Californians and those in the export trade. As gold did not circulate in the East, most Philadelphia pieces of this era were either sent west, or exported and melted.

In November 1872, Chief Engraver William Barber, Longacre's successor, submitted a set of logotypes to show how the following year's date would appear on the coinage. They were approved, but on January 18, 1873, Chief Coiner A. Loudon Snowden filed a written complaint, stating that the "3" in the date too closely resembled an "8". Barber was ordered to redo his work; this decision affected most denominations of U.S. coins. The differences between the "Closed 3" and "Open 3" on the double eagle are small. One difference is that on the Closed 3, the two knobs on the "3" are equal in size; on the Open 3, the upper one is somewhat smaller. All Carson City and most San Francisco issues from that year are Closed 3.

=== Type III (1877–1907) ===
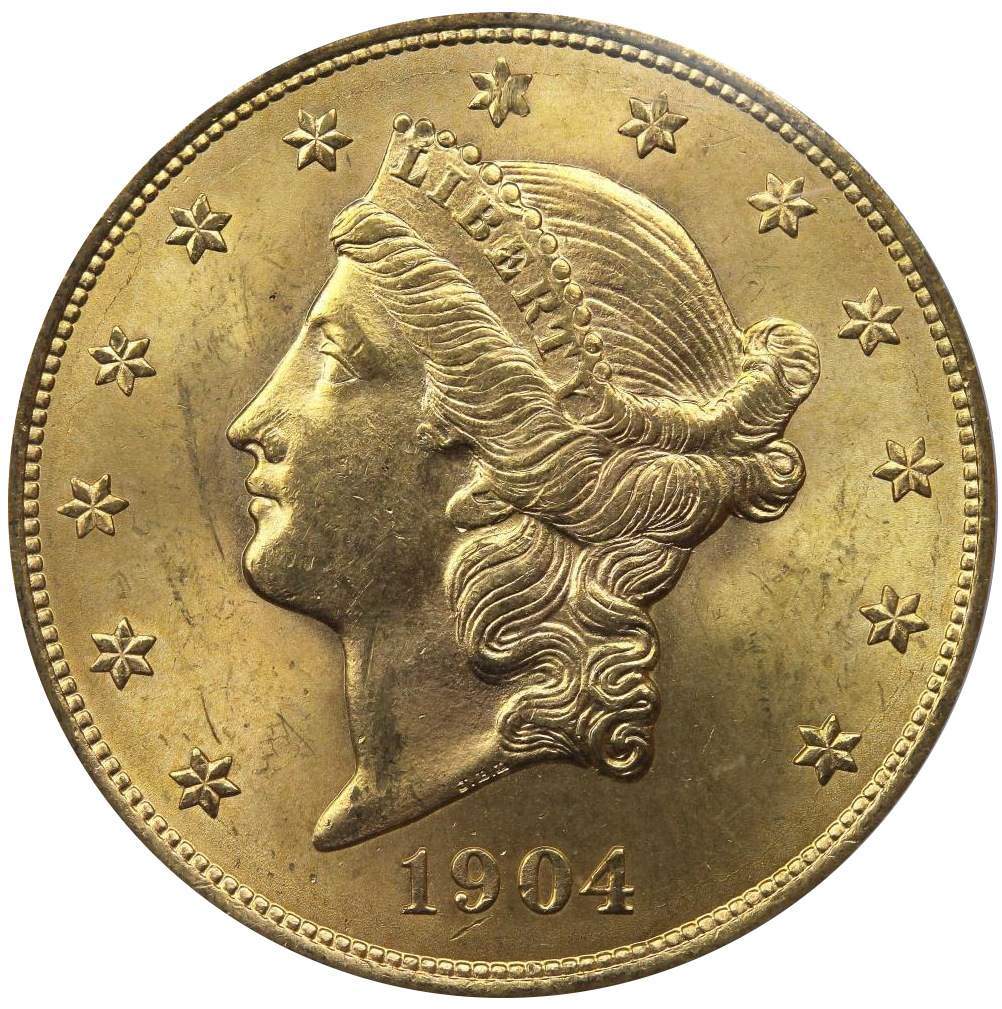
Obverse of 1904 double eagle. William Barber's modifications left more room for the date.

In 1876, William Barber altered the double eagle's reverse, emboldening "In God We Trust". The two varieties are known as the "Heavy Motto" and "Light Motto" types. He made more extensive changes for the following year's production. He truncated Liberty's neck at a sharper angle to allow more space for the date, which was punched into the dies by hand. In Longacre's original version, the tip of Liberty's coronet is very close to the seventh star clockwise from the date; beginning in 1877, it points between the sixth and seventh stars. A more noticeable change was made to the reverse, where the denomination, formerly "Twenty D.", was spelled out as "Twenty Dollars". The phrase "E Pluribus Unum", on the ribbon that the eagle bears, was enlarged. The new dies initially created difficulties at the Mint and Barber made minor adjustments to the design over the first few months of production.

Many double eagles were struck at San Francisco between 1877 and 1883. Beginning in 1881, mintage of double eagles at Philadelphia was sharply curtailed. For the seven years 1881–1887, only 4,521 were made at that mint for circulation, none being struck in 1882, 1883, and 1887. They were struck yearly in proof at Philadelphia: the 1883 (mintage 92), 1884 (71) and 1887 (121) are great rarities. The mintage of 2,325 at New Orleans in 1879, the only postwar strikings there, is unexplained—Breen suggested that the local mint superintendent might have anticipated demand for the denomination. Double eagles were unpopular in commerce in the South, as were eagles. Millions of double eagles were sent to Europe as payment in international transactions beginning in the 1880s, often in cloth bags containing 250 coins, for a total of $5,000 per bag.

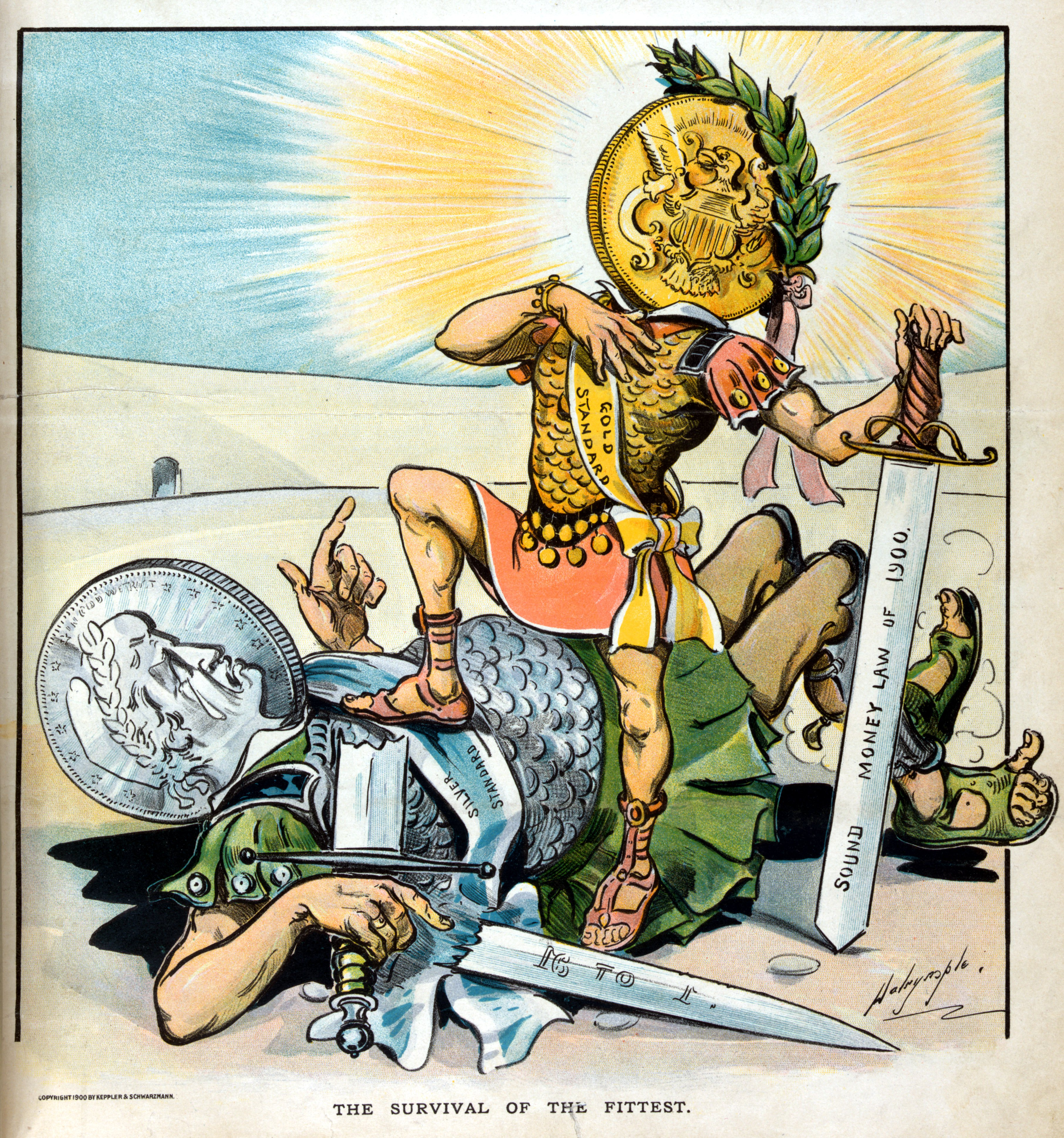
A 1900 cartoon from Puck magazine shows the gold standard, represented by the double eagle, triumphant over the silver.

In 1900, William Barber's successor as chief engraver, his son Charles E. Barber, slightly adjusted the design; other modifications to U.S. coins about that time suggest that he most likely did it as part of a plan to re-engrave all denominations. The most significant change made by Charles Barber was smoothing the back of the eagle's neck. In 1904, the Mint set records for production of double eagles: 6,256,699 at Philadelphia and 5,134,175 at San Francisco—highs for the series for those mints. The only higher production of double eagles after the Liberty Head series ended, was the figure of 8,816,000 from Philadelphia in 1928.

The 1891 discovery of gold at Cripple Creek, Colorado, in 1891 led to a gold rush there. The greater availability of gold in Colorado was one reason the Denver Mint was authorized in 1904—it opened in 1906. About a dozen proofs were struck for presentation to dignitaries when production of double eagles was inaugurated at Denver on April 4, 1906.

=== Replacement ===
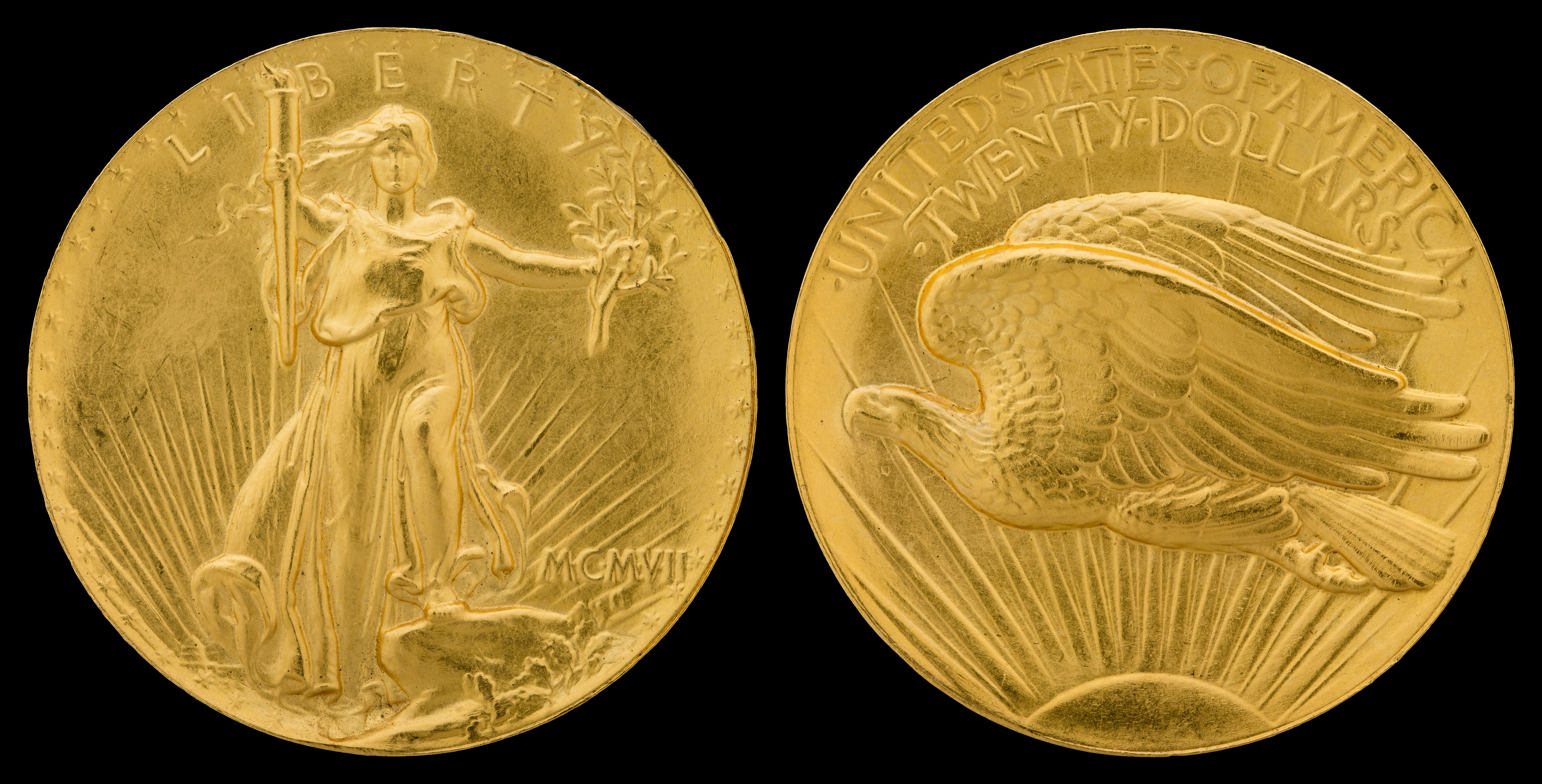
The Saint-Gaudens double eagle replaced the Liberty Head design.

In 1904, President Theodore Roosevelt complained to his Secretary of the Treasury, Leslie M. Shaw, about the designs on American coinage, and enquired if a sculptor such as the President's friend, Augustus Saint-Gaudens, could be hired to provide beautiful, up-to-date designs.

The following year, the Mint hired Saint-Gaudens to create new designs for the four gold pieces then being struck, as well as the cent. Other commissions delayed him, and as he became more ill with the cancer that would kill him, his work slowed. Chief Engraver Barber repeatedly objected to the design Saint-Gaudens finally submitted, which shows Liberty striding across a rocky outcrop, on the grounds that its relief was too high. After Saint-Gaudens's death on August 3, 1907, Barber produced his own, low-relief version of Saint-Gaudens's coin. Its striking began in late 1907, and it entered commerce that December—thereby putting an end to the Liberty Head double eagle series.

== Collecting ==
Large quantities of double eagles were melted in the 1930s by the government after they were called in under President Franklin D. Roosevelt. Although many of the double eagles exported in bulk in the late 19th and early 20th centuries were melted—records show that most sent to the United Kingdom were recoined into sovereigns—millions remained in banks. Large quantities of double eagles were found in the vaults of European banks beginning in the 1940s, and were placed on the numismatic market. Many common and low-grade Liberty Head double eagles have been sold as investments, valued based on their bullion content. Type I double eagles have been recovered from shipwrecks, bringing many high-grade early specimens onto the market, with the romance of "treasure coins" increasing the public demand.

In the 19th century, double eagles were little collected. Numismatists did not yet consider mint-marked coins to be distinct from those without. Even proof coins—with mintages in the dozens or low hundreds—sold on the secondary market at a slight increase from face value, and probably many were spent in hard times. In 1909, early numismatic writer Edgar H. Adams published a catalog of American gold issues. No Liberty Head double eagle was considered by Adams to be worth more than the value inscribed on it.

As it became clear in the 1940s that the withdrawal of gold coins in 1933 had left several late-date Saint-Gaudens double eagles unexpectedly rare, collector interest grew in the denomination. The massive importation of double eagles held overseas once Americans were allowed to own gold again in 1974 added to the supply, but according to numismatic writer and coin dealer Bowers, "today they are of such wide popularity, fascination, and interest that the record prices achieved [at an important sale in 1949] seem like incredible bargains!"

There are many ways to collect Liberty Head double eagles. Some, wishing only a few pieces, may choose one each of the three major types, or seek pieces from the five mints that struck them. Carson City double eagles are highly popular. As the 1870-CC is almost unobtainable, collectors may limit themselves to Carson City Type III pieces (1877–1893). Collectors seeking one double eagle per year of mintage will find it expensive to fill the 1886 entry, a year in which double eagles were only struck at Philadelphia, and just 1,000 business strikes and 106 proof pieces were issued. The 2015 edition of R.S. Yeoman's A Guide Book of United States Coins lists the 1886 in Very Fine condition (VF-20) at $22,500.
