= Peter Cross (engraver) =

- Born: October 6, 1815; New York City, New York, U.S.
- Died: October 13, 1862 (aged 47); Philadelphia, Pennsylvania
- Occupation: Engraver

Peter Filatreu Cross (October 6, 1815 – October 13, 1862) was an assistant engraver to James B. Longacre at the U.S. Mint in Philadelphia, Pennsylvania.

== Early life ==
Cross was born in New York City to William Cross (a ship captain, missing at sea September 1815, his last letter home before going missing still exists as of 2025, and is in the hands of a 4× great-grandson) and Elizabeth A. Cross, and despite Mint records stating that he died in 1856, he appears in the 1860 U.S. Census in Philadelphia. He married Harriet Amelia Chapin and had five children, Anna Maria Cross (later Willard, 1843–1917), Hannah Elizabeth (later Marple, 1845-1902), William Edward (1847-1875), Chapin Filatreau (1854-1857) and Edmond Filatreau (1859-1861).

== Career ==
He is best known for his work on the reverse of the 1849 one dollar ($1) gold coin. The value of gold required the coin to be so small — 12.7 millimetres (0.50 in) in diameter) — that too many people were losing them, so it had to be redesigned (In spending power, the dollar of 1849 is equal to $37.8 today, but even that value is far exceeded by the collector value as well as by the present value of the gold content). He also designed medals of the period, including a medal of Commander Duncan Ingraham.

== Death ==
Cross died on October 13, 1862, in Philadelphia, Pennsylvania, and is buried at Lawnview Cemetery in Rockledge, Pennsylvania. He was disinterred from the Odd Fellows Cemetery in Philadelphia c. 1951 when that cemetery was removed to make way for the Raymond Rosen housing project, which itself was demolished in 1995 as part of an urban renewal program.

On March 14, 2013, Cross was mentioned by full name in the Jump Start comic strip, written by Robb Armstrong, a native of Philadelphia, in an arc about coin collecting.
