= Gold dollar =

Gold $1 coin of the United States

Gold dollar ($1)
- United States
- Value: 1 United States dollar
- Mass: 1.672 g
- Diameter: For Type 1, 12.7 mm. For Types 2 and 3, 14.3 mm (For Type 1, .500 inch. For types 2 and 3, .563 in)
- Edge: Reeded
- Composition: 90% gold, 10% copper
- Gold: .04837 troy oz
- Years of minting: 1849–1889
- Mint marks: C, D, O, S. Found immediately below the wreath on the reverse. Philadelphia Mint pieces lack mint mark.

Obverse
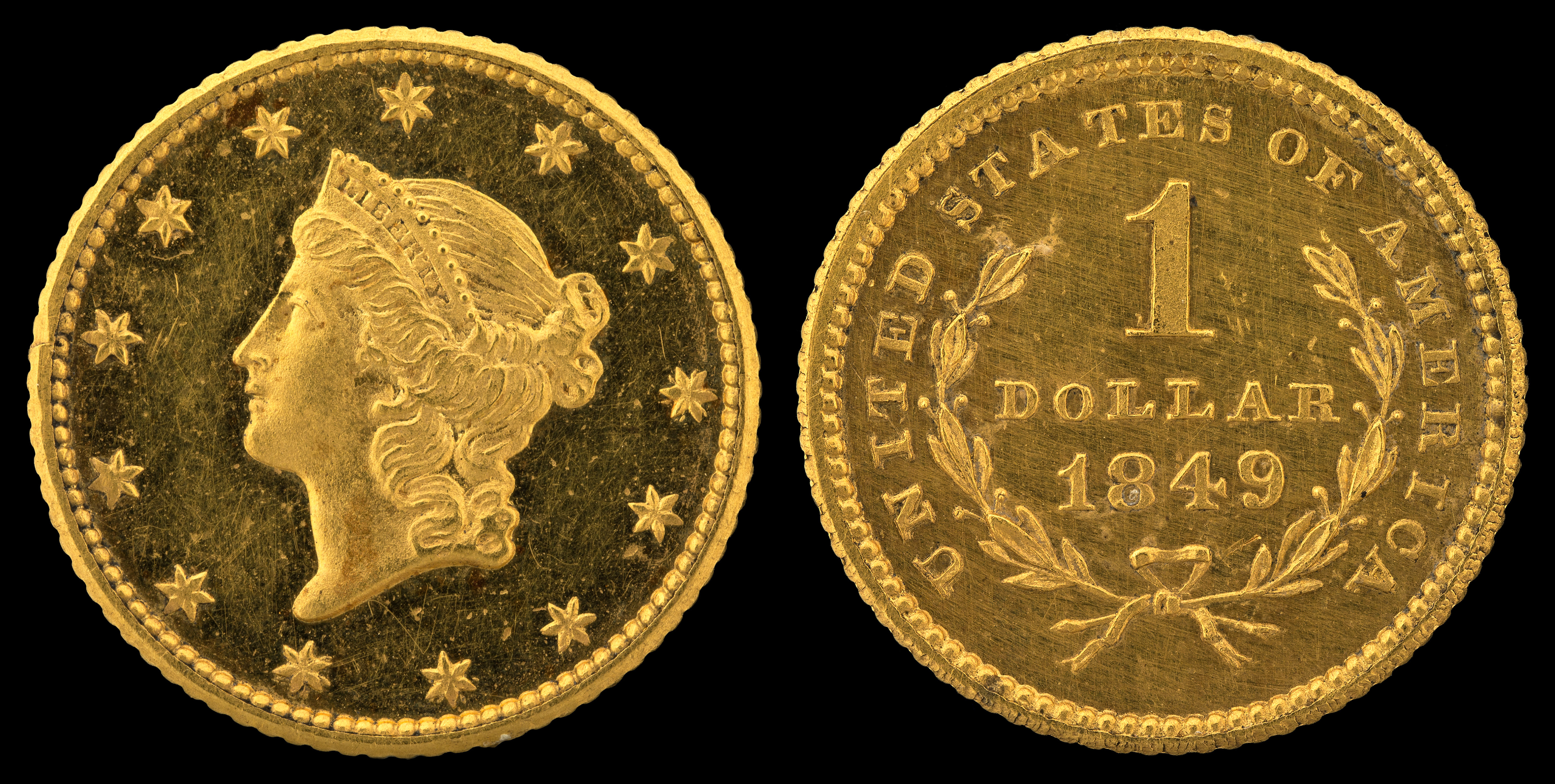
- Design: Liberty wearing a coronet. Type 1.
- Designer: James B. Longacre
- Design date: 1849
- Design discontinued: 1854
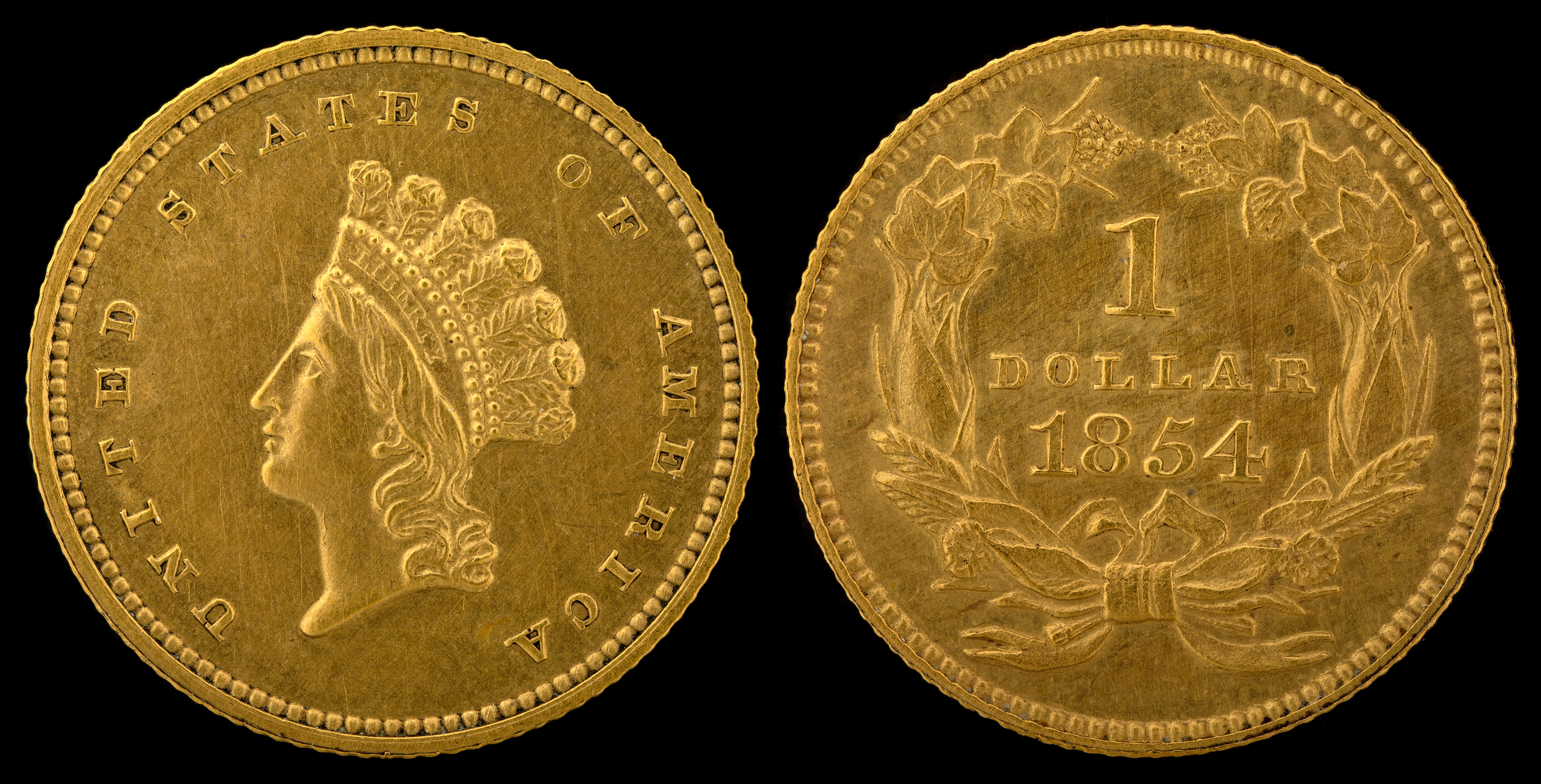
- Design: Liberty as an Indian princess. Type 2 (small head)
- Designer: James B. Longacre
- Design date: 1854
- Design discontinued: 1856
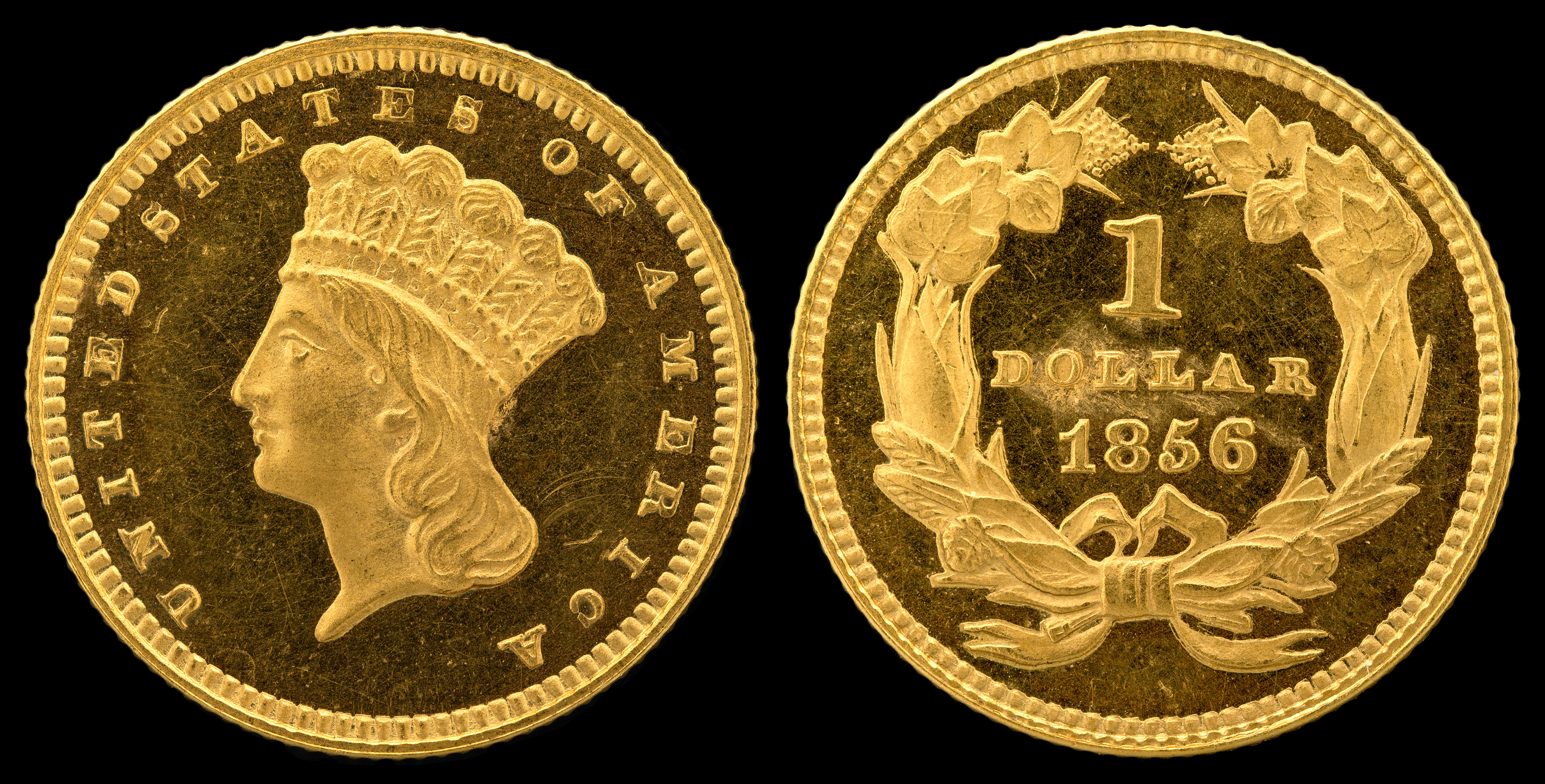
- Design: Type 3 (large head)
- Designer: James B. Longacre
- Design date: 1856
- Design discontinued: 1889

Reverse
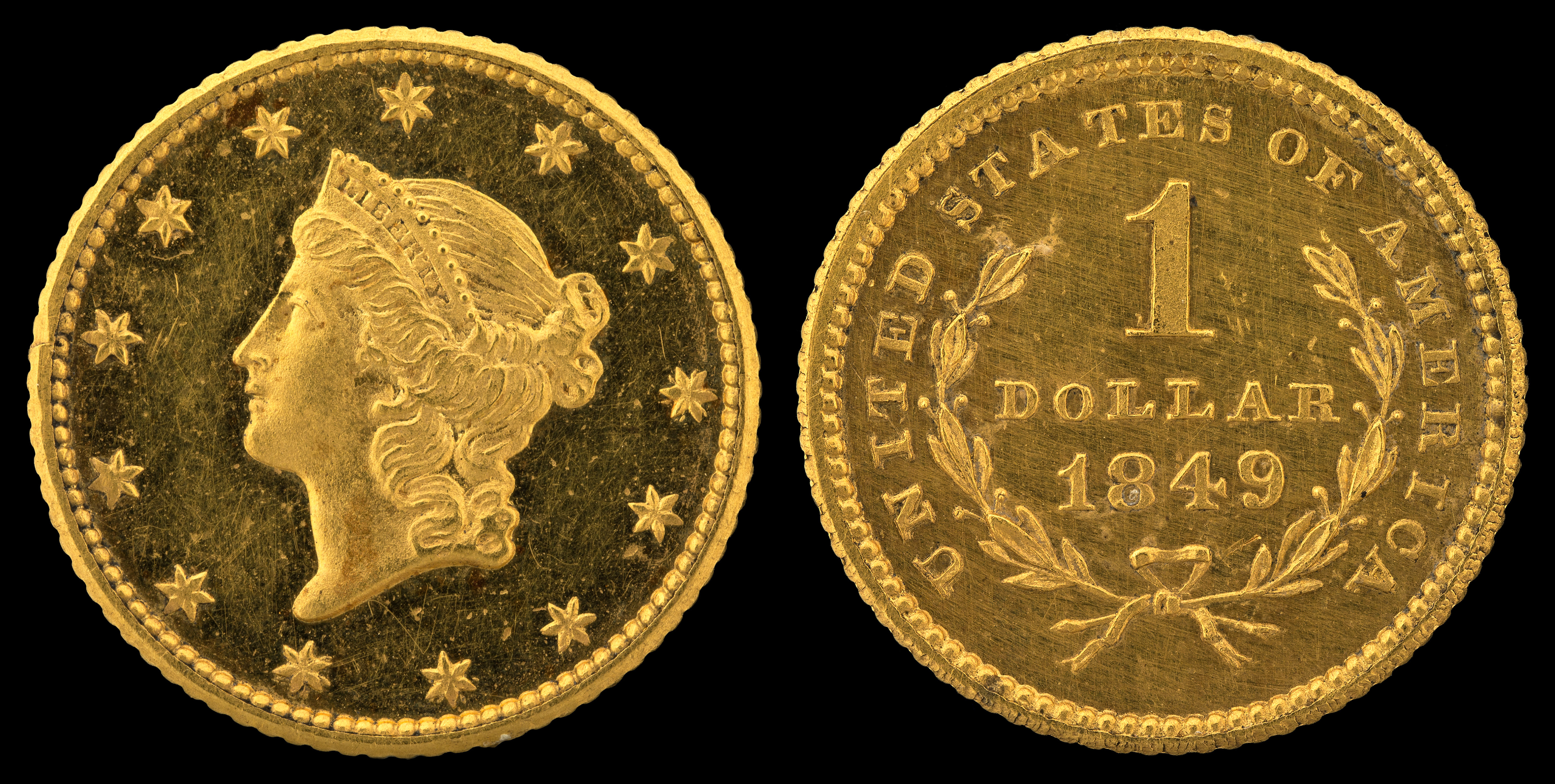
- Design: Type 1
- Designer: Peter Filatreu Cross
- Design date: 1849
- Design discontinued: 1854
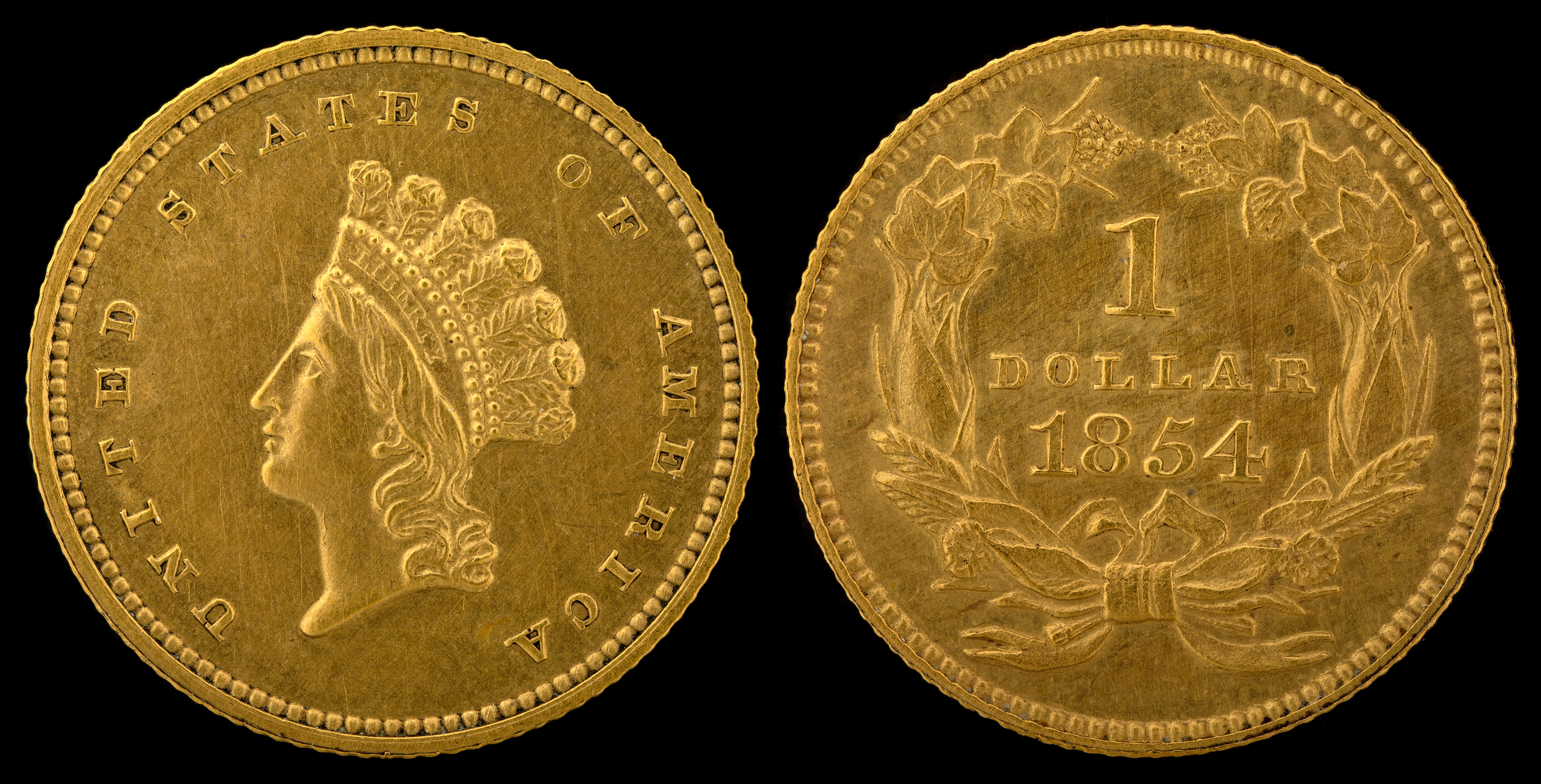
- Design: Types 2 and 3
- Designer: James B. Longacre
- Design date: 1854
- Design discontinued: 1889

The gold dollar or gold one-dollar piece is a gold coin that was struck as a regular issue by the United States Bureau of the Mint from 1849 to 1889. The coin had three types over its lifetime, all designed by Mint Chief Engraver James B. Longacre. The Type 1 issue has the smallest diameter (0.5 inch =12.7mm) of any United States coin minted to date.

A gold dollar coin had been proposed several times in the 1830s and 1840s, but was not initially adopted. Congress was finally galvanized into action by the increased supply of bullion caused by the California gold rush, and in 1849 authorized a gold dollar. In its early years, silver coins were being hoarded or exported, and the gold dollar found a ready place in commerce. Silver again circulated after Congress in 1853 required that new coins of that metal be made lighter, and the gold dollar became a rarity in commerce even before federal coins vanished from circulation because of the economic disruption caused by the American Civil War.

Gold did not again circulate in most of the nation until 1879; once it did, the gold dollar did not regain its place. In its final years, it was struck in small numbers, causing speculation by hoarders. It was also in demand to be mounted in jewelry. The regular issue gold dollar was last struck in 1889; the following year, Congress ended the series.

== Background ==
In proposing his plan for a mint and a coinage system, Secretary of the Treasury Alexander Hamilton in 1791 proposed that the one-dollar denomination be struck both as a gold coin, and as one of silver, representative of the two metals which he proposed be made legal tender. Congress followed Hamilton's recommendation only in part, authorizing a silver dollar, but no coin of that denomination in gold.

In 1831, the first gold dollar was minted, at the private mint of Christopher Bechtler in North Carolina. Much of the gold then being produced in the United States came from the mountains of North Carolina and Georgia, and the dollars and other small gold coins issued by Bechtler circulated through that region, and were now and then seen further away. Additional one-dollar pieces were struck by August Bechtler, Christopher's son.

Soon after the Bechtlers began to strike their private issues, Secretary of the Treasury Levi Woodbury became an advocate of having the Mint of the United States ("Mint", when described as an institution) strike the one-dollar denomination in gold. He was opposed by the Mint Director, Robert M. Patterson. Woodbury persuaded President Andrew Jackson to have pattern coins struck. In response, Patterson had Mint Second Engraver Christian Gobrecht (Note: Later chief engraver. See Taxay, p. 204. The incumbent chief engraver, William Kneass, had been partially incapacitated by a stroke in 1835, though he retained his office. See Taxay, pp. 170–171, 176) break off work on the new design for the silver one-dollar coin and work on a pattern for the gold dollar. Gobrecht's design featured a Liberty cap surrounded by rays on one side, and a palm branch arranged in a circle with the denomination, date, and name of the country on the other.

Consideration was given to including the gold dollar as an authorized denomination in the revisionary legislation that became the Mint Act of 1837. The Philadelphia newspaper Public Ledger, in December 1836, supported a gold dollar, stating that "the dollar is the smallest gold coin that would be convenient, and as it would be eminently so, neither silver nor paper should be allowed to take its place." Nevertheless, after Mint Director Patterson appeared before a congressional committee, the provision authorizing the gold dollar was deleted from the bill.

== Inception ==
In January 1844, North Carolina Representative James Iver McKay, the chairman of the Committee on Ways and Means, solicited the views of Director Patterson on the gold dollar. Patterson had more of Gobrecht's pattern dollar struck to show to committee members, again advising against a coin that if issued would be only about a half inch (13 mm) in diameter. He told Treasury Secretary John C. Spencer that the only gold coins of that size in commerce, the Spanish and Colombian half-escudos, were unpopular and had not been struck for more than twenty years. This seemed to satisfy the committee as nothing more was done for the time, and when a gold dollar was proposed again in 1846, McKay's committee recommended against it.

Even before 1848, record amounts of gold were flowing to American mints to be struck into coin, but the California Gold Rush vastly increased these quantities. This renewed calls for a gold dollar, as well as for a higher denomination than the eagle ($10 piece), then the largest gold coin. In January 1849, McKay introduced a bill for a gold dollar, which was referred to his committee. There was much discussion in the press about the proposed coin; one newspaper published a proposal for an annular gold dollar; that is, with a hole in the middle to increase its small diameter. McKay amended his legislation to provide for a double eagle ($20 gold coin) and wrote to Patterson, who replied stating that the annular gold dollar would not work, and neither would another proposal to have dollar piece consisting of a gold plug in a silver coin. Nevertheless, Gobrecht's successor as chief engraver, James B. Longacre, prepared patterns, including some with a square hole in the middle.

McKay got his fellow Democrat, New Hampshire Senator Charles Atherton, to introduce the bill to authorize the gold dollar and the double eagle in the Senate on February 1, 1849—Atherton was chairman of the Senate Finance Committee. McKay introduced a version into the House on February 20; debate began the same day. The dollar was attacked by congressmen from the Whig Party, then in the minority, on the grounds that it would be too small, would be counterfeited and in bad light might be mistakenly spent as a half dime, the coins being similar in size. McKay did not respond substantively, but stated that if no one wanted these denominations, they would not be called for at the Mint, and would not be coined. Pennsylvania Representative Joseph Ingersoll, a Whig, spoke against the bill, noting that Patterson opposed the new denominations, and that the idea had been repeatedly turned down, whenever considered. Another Whig, Massachusetts's Charles Hudson, related that Patterson had sent a real and a counterfeit gold dollar to his committee and the majority of members had been unable to tell the difference. McKay made no answer to these claims, but others did, including New York Congressman Henry Nicoll, who assured the House that the counterfeiting allegations were greatly exaggerated. The point was, he indicated, that the double eagle and gold dollar were wanted by the public, and, in the case of the gold dollar could help money circulate in small communities where banknotes were not accepted. Connecticut Representative John A. Rockwell, a Whig, tried to table the bill, but his motion was defeated. The bill passed easily, and met only minimal opposition in the Senate, becoming law on March 3, 1849.

== Preparation ==
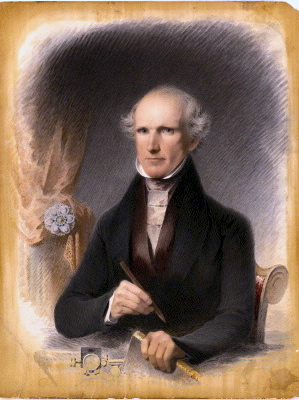
James B. Longacre, self-portrait (1845)

The officers at the Philadelphia Mint, including Chief Coiner Franklin Peale, were mostly the friends and relations of Director Patterson. The outsider in their midst was Chief Engraver (Note: Formally, "Engraver to the United States Mint at Philadelphia"; he had no full-time assistant engravers then. The office came to be known as "Chief Engraver" later. See Bowers 2004, p. 25) James B. Longacre, successor to Gobrecht (who had died in 1844). A former copper-plate engraver, Longacre had been appointed through the political influence of South Carolina Senator John C. Calhoun.

When Longacre began work on the two new coins in early 1849, he had no one to assist him. Longacre wrote the following year that he had been warned by a Mint employee that one of the officers (undoubtedly Peale) planned to undermine the chief engraver's position by having the work of preparing designs and dies done outside Mint premises. Accordingly, when the gold coin bill became law, Longacre apprised Patterson that he was ready to begin work on the gold dollar. The Mint Director agreed, and after viewing a model of the head on the obverse, authorized Longacre to proceed with preparation of dies. According to Longacre,

The engraving was unusually minute and required very close and incessant labor for several weeks. I made the original dies and hubs for making the working dies twice over, to secure their perfect adaptation to the coining machinery. I had a wish to execute this work single handed, that I might thus silently reply to those who had questioned my ability for the work. The result, I believe, was satisfactory.

== Original design ==
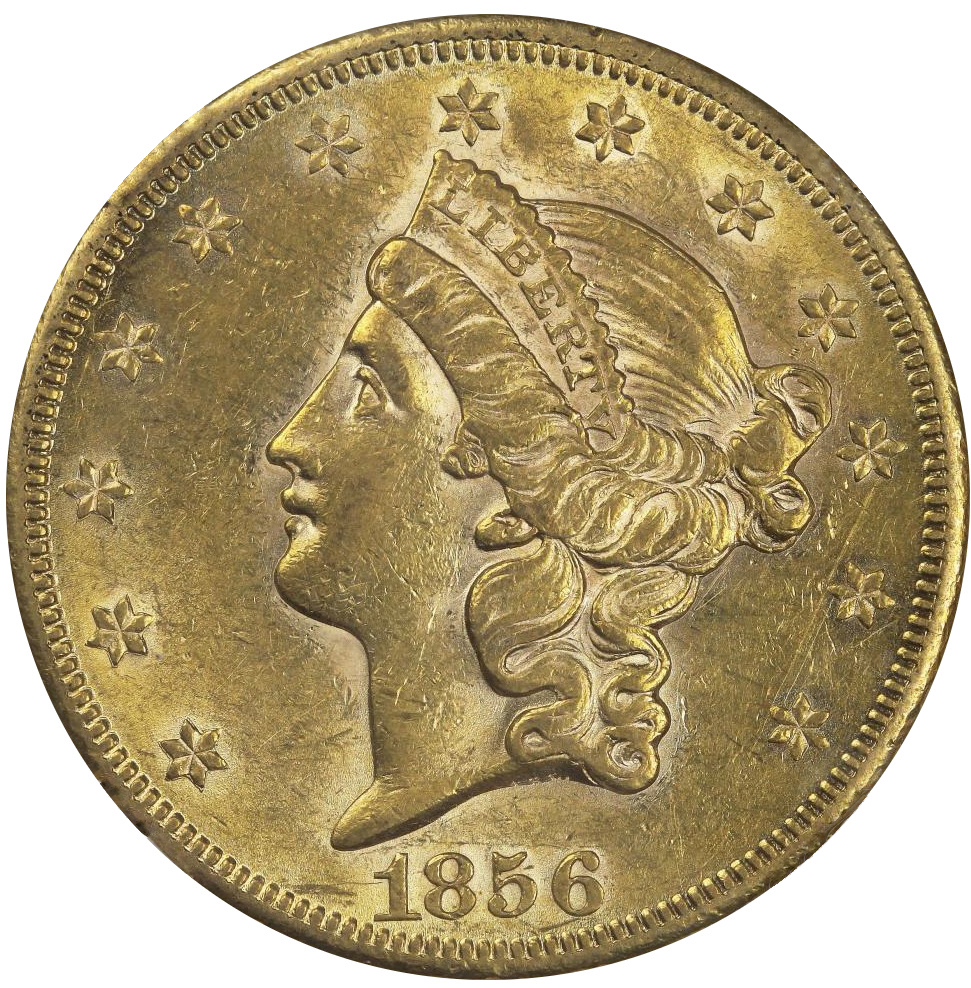
The head of Liberty on the Type 1 dollar resembles that on Longacre's Liberty Head double eagle.

The Type 1 gold dollar depicts a head of Liberty, facing left, with a coronet or tiara on her head bearing her name. Her hair is gathered in a bun; she is surrounded by 13 stars representing the original states. The reverse features the date and denomination within a wreath, with the name of the nation near the rim.

Contemporary reviews of the Type 1 design were generally favorable. The New York Weekly Tribune on May 19, 1849, described the new dollar as "undoubtedly the neatest, tiniest, lightest, coin in this country ... it is too delicate and beautiful to pay out for potatoes, and sauerkraut, and salt pork. Oberon might have paid Puck with it for bringing the blossom which bewitched Titania." Willis' Bank Note List stated that "there is no probability of them ever getting into general circulation; they are altogether too small." The North Carolina Standard hoped that they would be struck at the Charlotte Mint and circulated locally to eliminate the problem of small-denomination bank notes from out of state. Coin dealer and numismatic author Q. David Bowers notes that the head of Liberty on the Type 1 dollar is a scaled-down version of that on the double eagle, and "a nicely preserved gold dollar is beautiful to behold".

== Modifications ==
The 1849 gold dollar

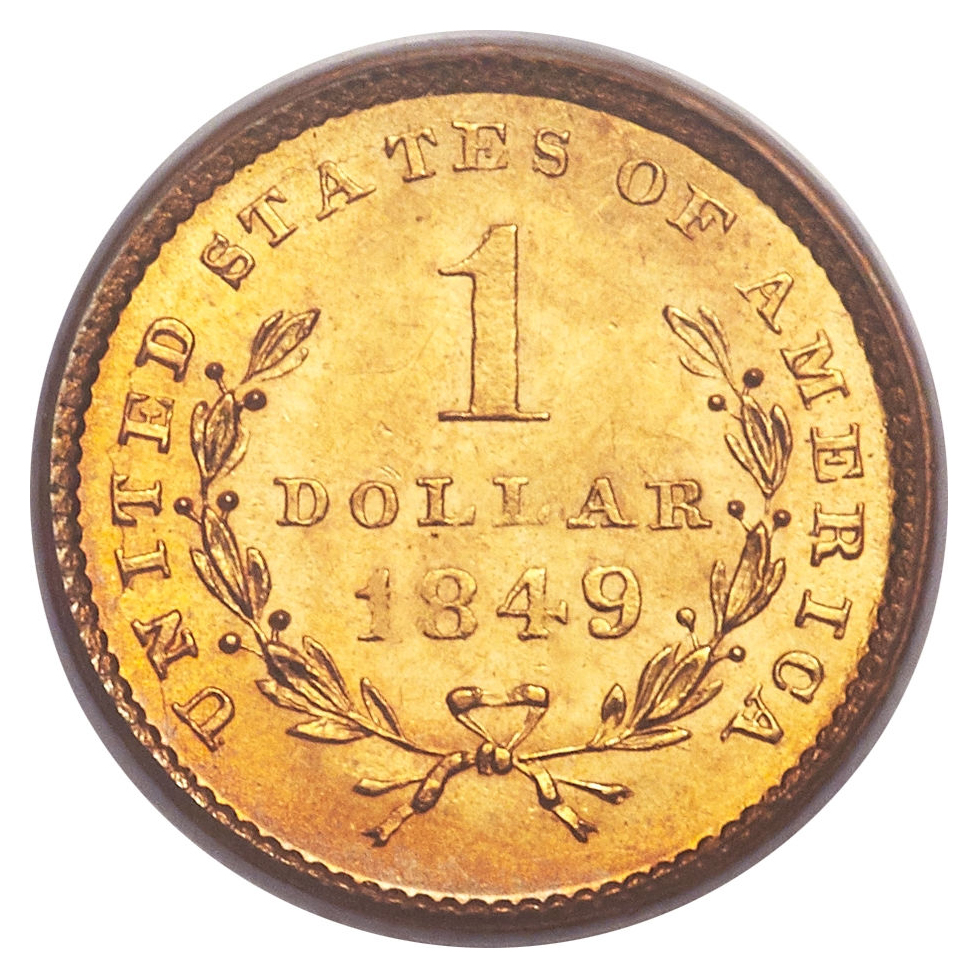
Open wreath

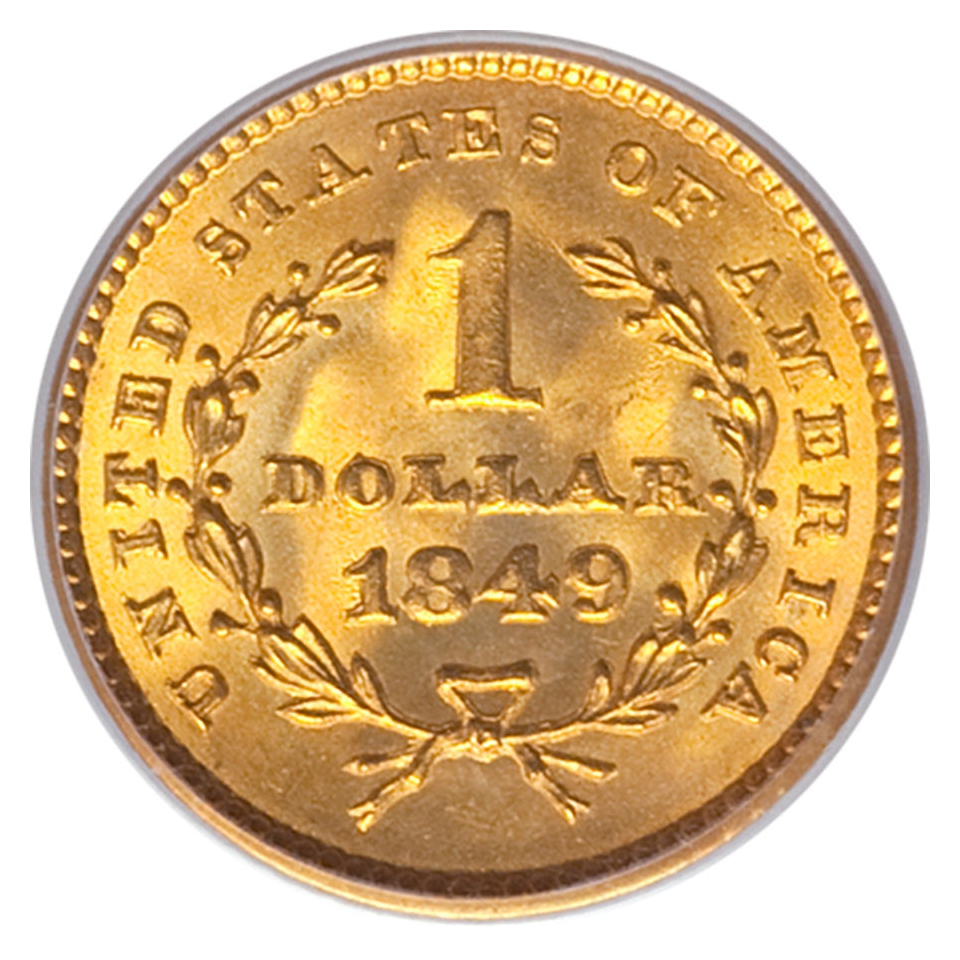
Closed wreath

Mint records indicate the first gold dollars were produced on May 7, 1849; Longacre's diary notes state instead that the first were struck on May 8. A few coins in proof condition were struck on the first day, along with about 1,000 for circulation. There are five major varieties of the 1849 gold dollar from Philadelphia, made as Longacre continued to fine-tune the design. Mintmarked dies were sent by Longacre's Engraving Department at the Philadelphia Mint to the branch mints at Charlotte, Dahlonega (in Georgia), and New Orleans; coins struck at the branches resemble some of the types issued from Philadelphia, depending on when the dies were produced. Of the coins struck at the branch mints in 1849, only pieces struck at Charlotte (1849-C) exist in multiple varieties; most are of what is dubbed the "Closed Wreath" variety. Approximately five of the 1849-C Open Wreath are known; one, believed the finest surviving specimen, sold at auction for $690,000 in 2004, (Note: equivalent to $1.18 million in 2025 adjusted for inflation) remaining a record for the gold dollar series as of 2013. One of the changes made during production was the inclusion of Longacre's initial "L" on the truncation of Liberty's neck, the first time a U.S. coin intended for full-scale production had borne the initial of its designer. All issues beginning in 1850 bear the Closed Wreath. Beginning in 1854, the gold dollar was also struck at the new San Francisco Mint.

The continued flow of gold from California made silver expensive in terms of gold, and U.S. silver coins began to flow out of the country for melting in 1849, a flow that accelerated over the next several years as the price of the metal continued to rise. By 1853, a thousand dollars in silver coin contained $1,042 worth of bullion. As silver coins vanished, the gold dollar became the only federal coin in circulation between the cent and the quarter eagle ($2.50 piece). As such, it was struck in large numbers and widely circulated. According to Bowers in his book on the denomination, "the years 1850 to 1853 were the high-water mark of the gold dollar, the glory years of the denomination when the little gold coins took the place of half dollars and silver dollars in everyday transactions." This time came to an end in 1853 when Congress passed an act reducing the weight of most silver coins, allowing new issues of them to circulate.

As early as 1851, New York Congressman William Duer alleged that Patterson had made the gold dollar too small in diameter on purpose to provoke criticism. Patterson retired that year after 16 years in his position, and under his successor, George N. Eckert, annular gold dollar and half dollar patterns were struck. Public Ledger reported that although gold dollars would not be struck in annular form, gold half dollars would be, to help fill the need for change. With the new Pierce administration, Thomas M. Pettit took office as Mint Director on March 31, 1853. In April, Treasury Secretary James Guthrie wrote to Pettit that there were complaints that the gold dollar was too small, often lost or mistaken for a small silver coin, and enquired about reports that the Mint had experimented with annular dollars. Pettit replied, stating that none had been preserved, but enclosed a silver piece of equivalent size. He noted that while there would be technical difficulties in the production of the annular dollar, these could be overcome. In a letter dated May 10, Pettit proposed an oval-shaped holed piece, or an angular-shaped coin, which would lessen the production problems. Pettit died suddenly on May 31; Guthrie did not let the issue fall, but queried Pettit's replacement, James Ross Snowden, concerning the issue on June 7. As U.S. coins were required to bear some device emblematic of liberty, the secretary hoped that artists could be found who could find some such design for an annular coin.

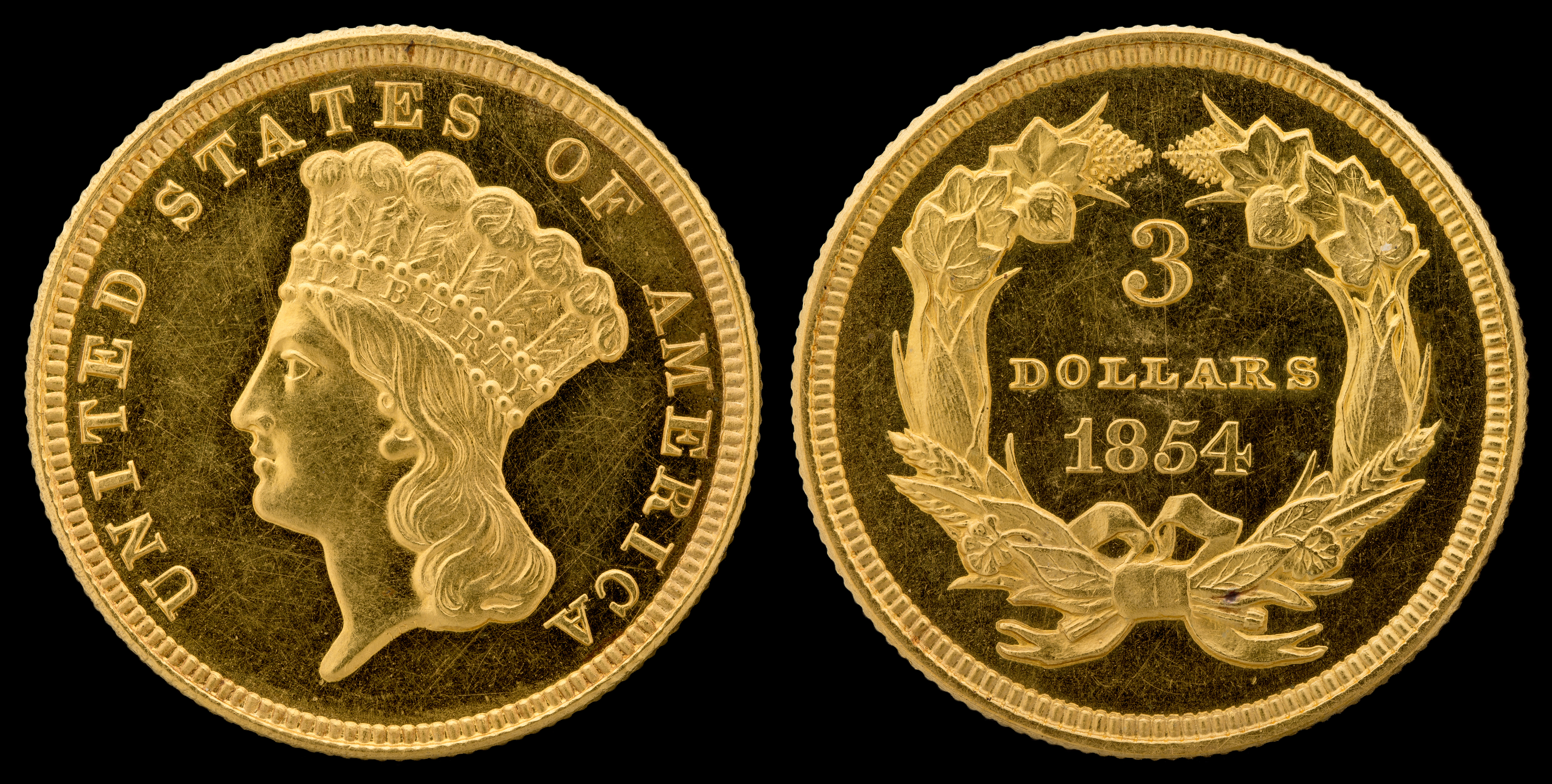
Longacre's design for the three-dollar piece (above) was adapted for the Types 2 and 3 gold dollar.

The Act of February 21, 1853, that had lightened the silver coins also authorized a gold three-dollar piece, which began to be produced in 1854. To ensure that the three-dollar piece was not mistaken for other gold coins, it had been made thinner and wider than it would normally be, and Longacre put a distinctive design with an Indian princess on it. Longacre adapted both the technique and the design for the gold dollar, which was made thinner, and thus wider. An adaptation of Longacre's princess for the larger gold coin was placed on the dollar, and a similar agricultural wreath on the reverse. The idea of making the gold dollar larger in this way had been suggested in Congress as early as 1852, and had been advocated by Pettit, but Guthrie's desire for an annular coin stalled the matter. In May 1854, Snowden sent Guthrie a letter stating that the difficulties with an annular coin, especially in getting the coins to eject properly from the press, were more than trivial.

Nevertheless, the Type 2 gold dollar (as it came to be known) proved unsatisfactory as the mints had difficulty in striking the new coin so that all details were brought out. This was due to the high relief of the design—the three Southern branch mints especially had trouble with the piece. Many of the Type 2 pieces quickly became illegible, and were sent back to Philadelphia for melting and recoinage. On most surviving specimens, the "85" in the date is not fully detailed. The Type 2 gold dollar was struck only at Philadelphia in 1854 and 1855, at the three Southern branch mints in the latter year, and at San Francisco in 1856, after the design was designated for replacement. To correct the problems, Longacre enlarged the head of Liberty, making it a scaled-down version of the three-dollar piece, and moved the lettering on the obverse closer to the rim. This improved the metal flow and design sharpness so much that early numismatic scholars assumed the reverse was also altered, though in fact no change was made and the Type 2 and Type 3 reverses are identical.

=== Design of Type 2 and 3 dollars ===
The Type 2 and 3 gold dollars depict Liberty as a Native American princess, with a fanciful feathered headdress not resembling any worn by any Indian tribe. This image is an inexact copy of the design Longacre had made for the three-dollar piece, and is one of a number of versions of Liberty that Longacre created based on the Venus Accroupie or Crouching Venus, a sculpture then on display in a Philadelphia museum. For the reverse, Longacre adapted the "agricultural wreath" he had created for the reverse of the three-dollar piece, composed of cotton, corn, tobacco, and wheat, blending the produce of North and South. This wreath would appear, later in the 1850s, on the Flying Eagle cent.

Art historian Cornelius Vermeule deprecated the Indian princess design used by Longacre for the obverses of the Types 2 and 3 gold dollar, and for the three-dollar piece, "the 'princess' of the gold coins is a banknote engraver's (Note: As was Longacre, before he became chief engraver) elegant version of folk art of the 1850s. The plumes or feathers are more like the crest of the Prince of Wales than anything that saw the Western frontiers, save perhaps on a music hall beauty."

== War years ==
The gold dollar continued to be produced in the late 1850s, though mintages declined from the figures of two million or more each year between 1850 and 1854. Only about 51,000 gold dollars were produced in 1860, with over two-thirds of that figure at Philadelphia, just under a third at San Francisco, and 1,566 at Dahlonega. Roughly a hundred are known of the last, creating one of the great rarities from Dahlonega in the series.

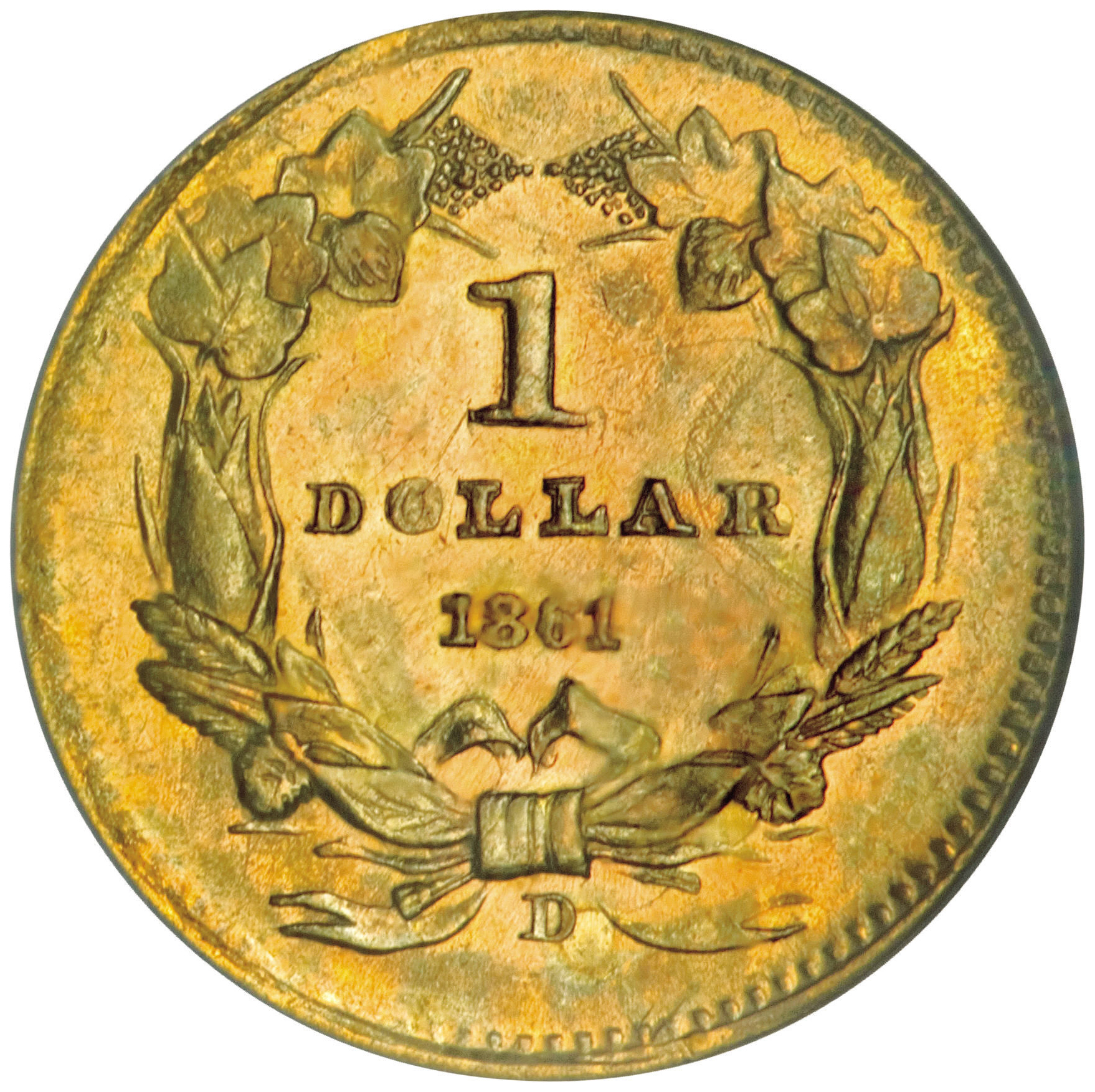
The 1861-D dollar

The other candidate for the rarest from that mint is the 1861-D, with an estimated mintage of 1,000 and perhaps 45 to 60 known. Two pairs of dies were shipped from Philadelphia to Dahlonega on December 10, 1860; they arrived on January 7, 1861, two weeks before Georgia voted to secede from the Union, as the American Civil War began. Under orders from Governor Joseph E. Brown, state militia secured the mint, and at some point, small quantities of dollars and half eagles were produced. Records of how many coins were struck and when have not survived. Since dies crack in time, and all the mints were supplied with them from Philadelphia, coining could not last, and in May 1861, coins and supplies remaining at Dahlonega were turned over to the treasury of the Confederate States of America, which Georgia had by then joined. Gold coins with a total face value of $6 were put aside for assay. Normally, they would have been sent to Philadelphia to await the following year's meeting of the United States Assay Commission, when they would be available for testing. Instead, these were sent to the initial Confederate capital of Montgomery, Alabama, though what was done with them there, and their ultimate fate, are unknown. The rarity of the 1861-D dollar, and the association with the Confederacy, make it especially prized.

Dahlonega, like the other two branch mints in the South, closed its doors after the 1861 strikings. It and the Charlotte facility never reopened; the New Orleans Mint again struck coins from 1879 to 1909, but did not strike gold dollars again. After 1861, the only issuance of gold dollars outside Philadelphia was at San Francisco, in 1870.

The outbreak of the Civil War shook public confidence in the Union, and citizens began hoarding specie, gold and silver coins. In late December 1861, banks and then the federal Treasury stopped paying out gold at face value. By mid-1862, all federal coins, even the base metal cent, had vanished from commerce in much of the country. The exception was the Far West, where for the most part, only gold and silver were acceptable currencies, and paper money traded at a discount. In the rest of the nation, gold and silver coins could be purchased from banks, exchange agents, and from the Treasury for a premium in the new greenbacks the government began to issue to fill the gap in commerce and finance the war.

== Final years, abolition, and collecting ==
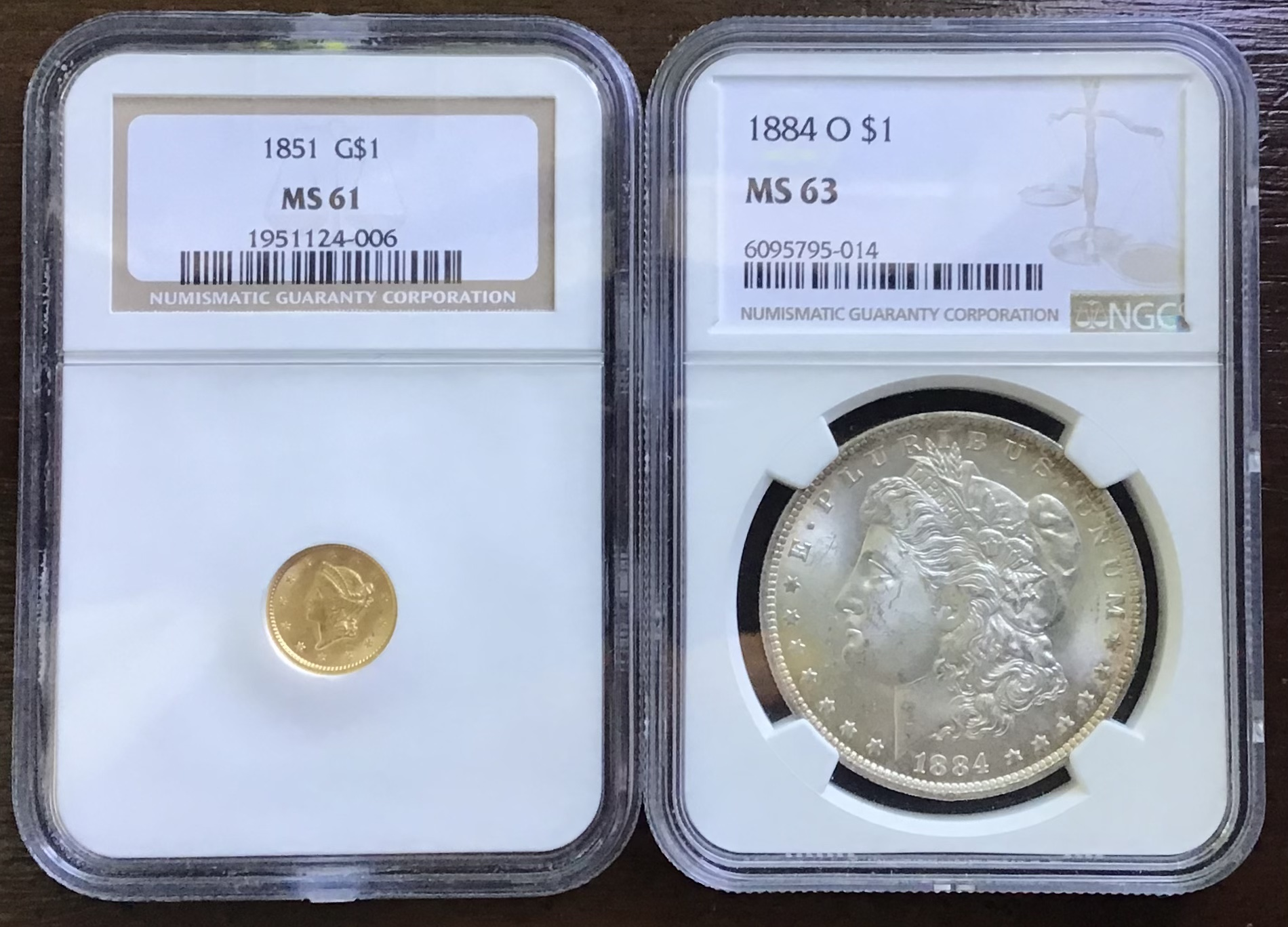
A 1851-P gold dollar next to a 1884-O Morgan dollar, both graded by NGC. Throughout its mintage years, the gold dollar was issued concurrently with the much larger silver dollar.

Since gold did not circulate in the United States (except on the West Coast) in the postwar period, much of the production of coins of that metal in the United States was double eagles for export. Accordingly, although 1,361,355 gold dollars were struck in 1862—the last time production would exceed a million—the mintage fell to 6,200 in 1863 and remained low for the rest of the coin's existence, excepting 1873 and 1874. The Mint felt it improper to suspend coinage of a coin authorized by Congress, and issued proof coins (generally a few dozen to the tiny numismatic community) from specially-polished dies, also producing enough circulation strikes so that the proof coins would not be unduly rare. In 1873 and 1874, old and worn gold dollars held by the government were melted and recoined, generating large mintages of that denomination. This was done in anticipation of the resumption of specie payments, which did not occur until the end of 1878. Once specie again circulated at face value, the gold dollar found no place in commerce amid large quantities of silver coinage, either released from hoarding or newly struck by the Mint. The government expected that the resumption of specie payments would cause the dollar and other small gold coins to circulate again, but the public, allowed to redeem paper currency, continued to use it as more convenient than coins.

In the 1870s and 1880s, public interest grew in the low-mintage gold dollar. Collecting coins was becoming more popular, and a number of numismatists put aside some gold dollars and hoped for increases in value. The Mint most likely channeled its production through some favored Philadelphia dealers, though proof coins could be purchased for $1.25 at the cashier's window at the Philadelphia facility. Banks charged a premium for circulation strikes. They were popular in the jewelry trade, mounted into various items. The coins were often exported to China or Japan, where such jewelry was made. The dollars were often damaged in the process; the Mint refused to sell into this trade and did its best to hinder it. Nevertheless, Mint officials concluded that jewelers were successful at getting the majority of each issue. Proof mintages exceeded 1,000 by 1884, and remained above that mark for the remainder of the series, numbers likely inflated by agents of jewelers, willing to pay the Mint's premium of $0.25 per coin. Another use for the gold dollar was as a holiday gift; after its abolition the quarter eagle became a popular present.

James Pollock, in his final report as Mint Director in 1873, advocated limiting striking of gold dollars to depositors who specifically requested it. "The gold dollar is not a convenient coin, on account of its small size, and it suffers more proportionately from abrasion than larger coins." His successors called for its abolition, with James P. Kimball, before he left office in 1889, writing to Congress that except as jewelry, "little practical use has been found for this coin". Later that year, the new director, Edward O. Leech, issued a report stating that the gold dollar "is too small for circulation, and ... [is] used almost exclusively for the purposes of ornament. The last year in which the gold dollar was struck was 1889. Congress abolished the gold dollar, along with the three-cent nickel and three-dollar piece, by the Act of September 26, 1890.

A total of 19,499,337 gold dollars were coined, of which 18,223,438 were struck at Philadelphia, 1,004,000 at New Orleans, 109,138 at Charlotte, 90,232 at San Francisco and 72,529 at Dahlonega. According to an advertisement in the February 1899 issue of The Numismatist, gold dollars brought $1.80 each, still in demand as a birthday present and for jewelry. That journal in 1905 carried news of a customer depositing 100 gold dollars into a bank; the teller, aware of the value, credited the account with $1.60 per coin. In 1908, a dealer offered $2 each for any quantity. As coin collecting became a widespread pastime in the early 20th century, gold dollars became a popular specialty, a status they retain. The 2014 edition of R.S. Yeoman's A Guide Book of United States Coins rates the least expensive gold dollar in very fine condition (VF-20) at $300, a value given for each of the Type 1 Philadelphia issues from 1849 to 1853. Those seeking one of each type will find the most expensive to be a specimen of the Type 2, with the 1854 and 1855 estimated at $350 in that condition; the other two types have dates valued at $300 in that grade.

=== Mintage figures ===
Mintage figures for Type 1 Liberty Head Gold Dollars (Circulation Strikes)
Year	Philadelphia Mint	Charlotte Mint	Dahlonega Mint	New Orleans Mint	San Francisco Mint
1849	688,567	11,634	21,588	215,000	
1850	481,953	6,966	8,382	14,000	
1851	3,317,671	41,267	9,882	290,000	
1852	2,045,351	9,434	6,360	140,000	
1853	24,076,051	11,515	6,583	290,000	
1854	855,502		2,935		14,632

Mintage figures for Types 2 & 3 Indian Princess Gold Dollars (Circulation Strikes)
Year	Philadelphia Mint	Charlotte Mint	Dahlonega Mint	New Orleans Mint	San Francisco Mint	Notes
1854	783,943					Type 2 (Small Head)
1855	758,269	9,803	1,811	55,000		Type 2 (Small Head)
1856	1,762,936		1,460		24,600	All are Type 3 (Large Head) except San Francisco (1856-S), which is Type 2 (Small Head)
1857	774,789	13,280	3,533		10,000	Type 3 (Large Head)
1858	117,995		3,477		10,000	Type 3 (Large Head)
1859	168,244	5,235	4,952		15,000	Type 3 (Large Head)
1860	36,514		1,566		13,000	Type 3 (Large Head)
1861	527,150		Estimated 1,250			Type 3 (Large Head)
1862	1,361,355					Type 3 (Large Head)
1863	6,200					Type 3 (Large Head)
1864	5,900					Type 3 (Large Head)
1865	3,700					Type 3 (Large Head)
1866	7,100					Type 3 (Large Head)
1867	5,200					Type 3 (Large Head)
1868	10,500					Type 3 (Large Head)
1869	5,900					Type 3 (Large Head)
1870	6,300				3,000	Type 3 (Large Head)
1871	3,900					Type 3 (Large Head)
1872	3,500					Type 3 (Large Head)
1873	125,100					Type 3 (Large Head)
1874	198,800					Type 3 (Large Head)
1875	400					Type 3 (Large Head)
1876	3,200					Type 3 (Large Head)
1877	3,900					Type 3 (Large Head)
1878	3,000					Type 3 (Large Head)
1879	3,000					Type 3 (Large Head)
1880	1,600					Type 3 (Large Head)
1881	7,620					Type 3 (Large Head)
1882	5,000					Type 3 (Large Head)
1883	10,800					Type 3 (Large Head)
1884	5,230					Type 3 (Large Head)
1885	11,156					Type 3 (Large Head)
1886	5,000					Type 3 (Large Head)
1887	7,500					Type 3 (Large Head)
1888	15,501					Type 3 (Large Head)
1889	28,950					Type 3 (Large Head)

Mintage figures for Gold Dollars (Proof Issues)
Year	Mintage	Notes
1849	10	Type 1 (Liberty Head)
1850	2	Type 1 (Liberty Head)
1854	5	Type 2 (Indian Princess, Small Head)
1855	12	Type 2 (Indian Princess, Small Head)
1856	10	Type 3 (Indian Princess, Large Head)
1857	12	Type 3 (Indian Princess, Large Head)
1858	20	Type 3 (Indian Princess, Large Head)
1859	80	Type 3 (Indian Princess, Large Head)
1860	154	Type 3 (Indian Princess, Large Head)
1861	349	Type 3 (Indian Princess, Large Head)
1862	35	Type 3 (Indian Princess, Large Head)
1863	50	Type 3 (Indian Princess, Large Head)
1864	50	Type 3 (Indian Princess, Large Head)
1865	25	Type 3 (Indian Princess, Large Head)
1866	30	Type 3 (Indian Princess, Large Head)
1867	50	Type 3 (Indian Princess, Large Head)
1868	25	Type 3 (Indian Princess, Large Head)
1869	25	Type 3 (Indian Princess, Large Head)
1870	35	Type 3 (Indian Princess, Large Head)
1871	30	Type 3 (Indian Princess, Large Head)
1872	30	Type 3 (Indian Princess, Large Head)
1873	25	Type 3 (Indian Princess, Large Head)
1874	20	Type 3 (Indian Princess, Large Head)
1875	20	Type 3 (Indian Princess, Large Head)
1876	45	Type 3 (Indian Princess, Large Head)
1877	20	Type 3 (Indian Princess, Large Head)
1878	20	Type 3 (Indian Princess, Large Head)
1879	30	Type 3 (Indian Princess, Large Head)
1880	36	Type 3 (Indian Princess, Large Head)
1881	87	Type 3 (Indian Princess, Large Head)
1882	125	Type 3 (Indian Princess, Large Head)
1883	207	Type 3 (Indian Princess, Large Head)
1884	1,006	Type 3 (Indian Princess, Large Head)
1885	1,105	Type 3 (Indian Princess, Large Head)
1886	1,016	Type 3 (Indian Princess, Large Head)
1887	1,043	Type 3 (Indian Princess, Large Head)
1888	1,079	Type 3 (Indian Princess, Large Head)
1889	1,779	Type 3 (Indian Princess, Large Head)

Note: All gold dollar proof coins were minted at the Philadelphia Mint.

== Gold Sacagawea dollar ==
In 1999, the Philadelphia Mint struck 39 Sacagawea dollars (dated 2000 and the "W" mint mark of the West Point Mint) in 22 karat gold. The Mint planned to sell gold Sacagawea dollars to collectors, but this plan was halted after Congressmen questioned the Mint's authority to strike dollars with a composition other than the one authorized. Twenty-seven of these coins were destroyed soon after they were minted, and the remaining 12 flew on Space Shuttle Columbia during STS-93. Afterwards the coins were displayed at various private events before being transferred to United States Bullion Depository at Fort Knox.

The coins were publicly displayed for the first time at the American Numismatic Association's World's Fair of Money in 2007. Afterwards they were returned to Fort Knox.

== Commemorative gold dollars ==
The gold dollar had a brief resurrection during the period of early United States commemorative coins. Between 1903 and 1922 nine different issues were produced, with a total mintage of 99,799. These were minted for various public events, did not circulate, and none used Longacre's design.

== Notes ==
Preceded by Seated Liberty dollar	Dollar coin of the United States (1849–1889) Concurrent with: Seated Liberty dollar (1849–1873); Trade dollar (1873–1885); Morgan dollar (1878–1889)	Succeeded by Morgan dollar
