= Two-cent piece (United States) =

Coin of the United States (1864–1873)

2 cents
- United States
- Value: (0.02 US dollars)
- Mass: 6.22 g
- Diameter: 23.00 mm
- Edge: plain
- Composition: 95 % copper; 5 % tin and zinc
- Years of minting: 1863 (patterns only); 1864–1873 (regular issues)
- Mint marks: None, all struck at Philadelphia Mint

Obverse
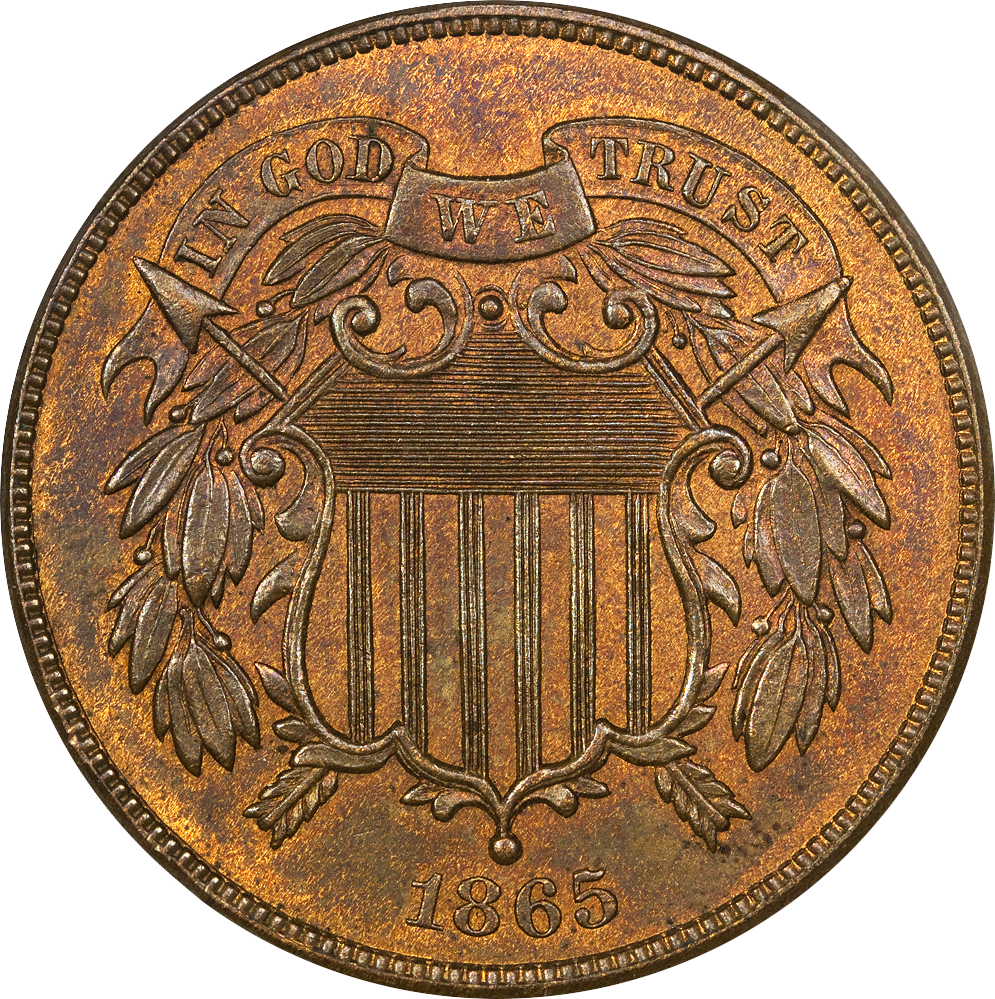
- Design: Shield, "IN GOD WE TRUST" on banner, date below.
- Designer: James B. Longacre
- Design date: 1863

Reverse
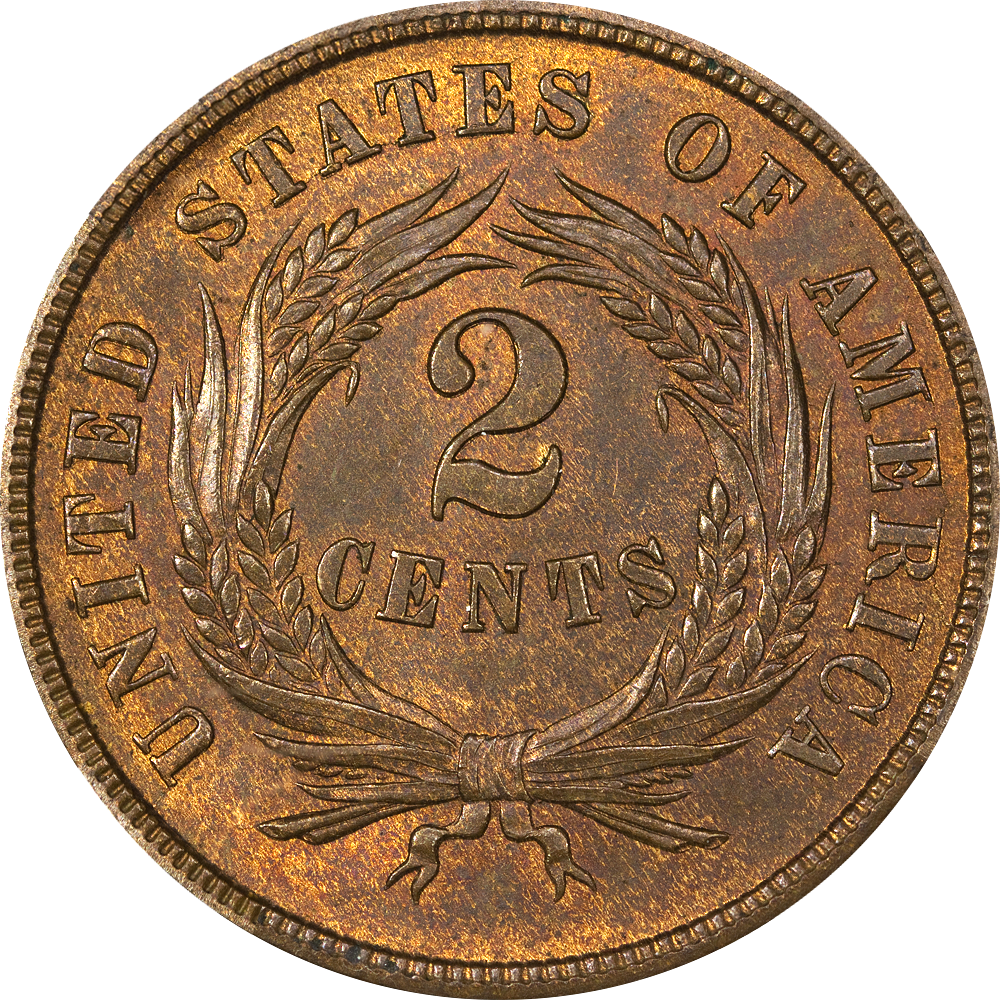
- Design: Wheat wreath, "UNITED STATES OF AMERICA" legend, "2 CENTS" in center.
- Designer: James B. Longacre
- Design date: 1863

The two-cent piece was produced by the Mint of the United States for circulation from 1864 to 1872 and for collectors in 1873. Designed by James B. Longacre, there were decreasing mintages each year, as other minor coins such as the nickel proved more popular. It was abolished by the Mint Act of 1873.

The economic turmoil of the American Civil War caused government-issued coins, even the non-silver Indian Head cent, to vanish from circulation, hoarded by the public. One means of filling this gap was private token issues, often made of bronze. The cent at that time was struck of a copper-nickel alloy, the same diameter as the later Lincoln cent, but somewhat thicker. The piece was difficult for the Philadelphia Mint to strike, and Mint officials, as well as the annual Assay Commission, recommended the coin's replacement. Despite opposition from those wishing to keep the metal nickel in the coinage, led by Pennsylvania Congressman Thaddeus Stevens, Congress passed the Coinage Act of 1864, authorizing bronze cents and two-cent pieces.

Although initially popular in the absence of other federal coinage, the two-cent piece's place in circulation was usurped by other base-metal coins which Congress subsequently authorized, the three-cent piece and the nickel. It was abolished in 1873; large quantities were redeemed by the government and melted. Nevertheless, two-cent pieces remain relatively inexpensive by the standards of 19th-century American coinage.

== Inception ==
A two-cent piece had been proposed in 1806 by Connecticut Senator Uriah Tracy, along with a twenty-cent piece or "double dime". Reflecting the then-prevalent view that coins should contain their value in metal, Tracy's bill provided that the two-cent piece be made of billon, or debased silver. The bill was opposed by Mint Director Robert Patterson, as it would be difficult to refine the silver from melted-down pieces. Although Tracy's legislation passed the Senate twice, in 1806 and 1807, it failed in the House of Representatives. Patterson sent a brass button with two of the billon planchets that would have been used for the coin to Tracy, showing how hard it would be to prevent counterfeiting. The Mint considered a two-cent piece in 1836, and experiments were conducted by Second Engraver Christian Gobrecht and Melter and Refiner Franklin Peale. The piece was to be again of billon, and provision for the coin was included in early drafts of the Mint Act of 1837, but the proposal was dropped when Peale was able to show that the coin could be easily counterfeited.

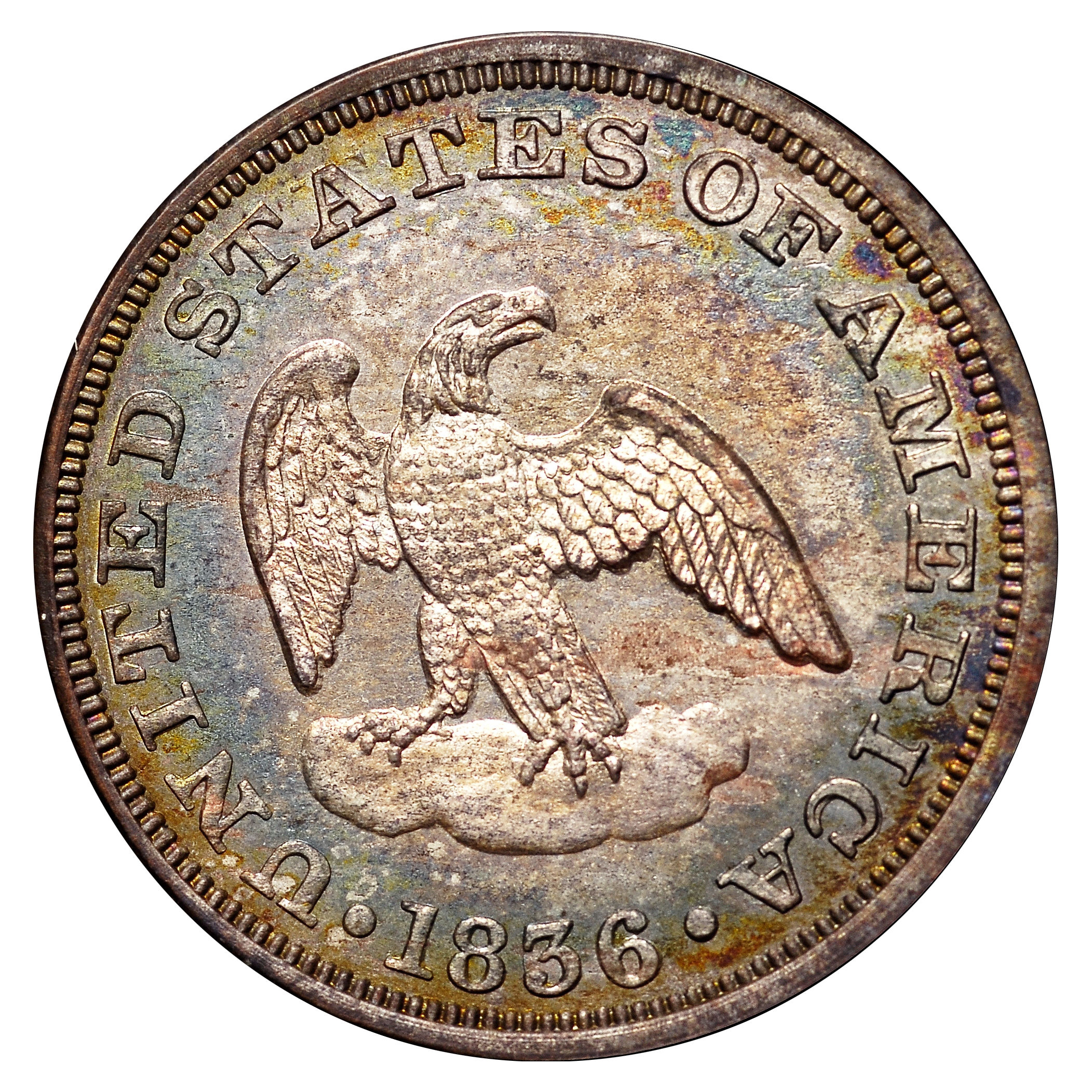
1836 pattern for the two-cent piece

Until 1857, the cent coin was a large copper piece, containing about its face value in metal. These coins were unpopular, and in 1857, after receiving congressional approval, the Mint began issuing the Flying Eagle cent, of the diameter of the later Lincoln cent, but somewhat thicker and made of copper-nickel alloy. These pieces readily circulated, and although the design did not strike well and was replaced by the Indian Head cent in 1859, the coins were commonly used until all federal coinage vanished from circulation in much of the United States in 1861 and 1862, during the economic turmoil of the American Civil War. This happened because many Northerners feared that if the war went poorly, paper money and government bonds might become worthless. The gap was filled by, among other things, private token issues, sometimes in copper-nickel approximating the size of the cent, but often thinner pieces in bronze.

This fact did not escape government officials, and when, in 1863, they attempted to restore coins to circulation, the use of bronze coins, which would not contain their face values in metal, was considered. In his annual report submitted October 1, 1863, Mint Director James Pollock noted that "whilst people expect a full value in their gold and silver coins, they merely want the inferior [base metal] money for convenience in making exact payments". He observed that the private cent tokens had sometimes contained as little as a fifth of a cent in metal, yet had still circulated. He proposed that the copper-nickel cent be replaced with a bronze piece of the same size. Pollock also wanted to eliminate nickel as a coinage metal; its hard alloys destroyed dies and machinery. On December 8, Pollock wrote to Treasury Secretary Salmon P. Chase, proposing a bronze cent and two-cent piece, and enclosing pattern coins of the two-cent piece that he had had prepared. According to numismatist Neil Carothers, a two-cent piece was most likely proposed in order to get as much dollar value in small change into circulation in as short a time as possible, as the Mint could strike a two-cent piece as easily as a cent.

== Legislation ==
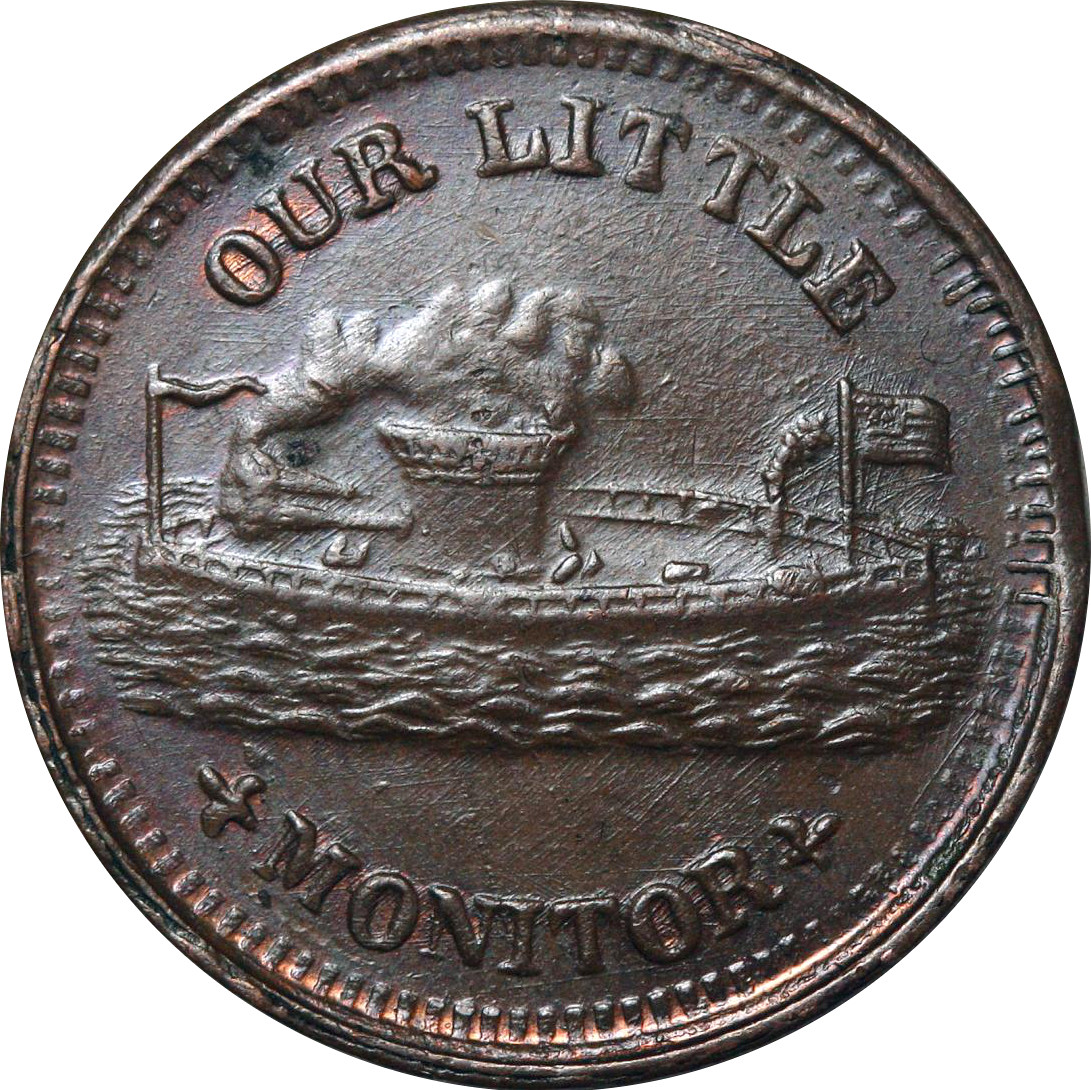
Cent-sized Civil War token, issued privately as all federal coinage was hoarded

On March 2, 1864, Pollock wrote urgently to Chase, warning him that the Mint was running out of nickel and that demand for cents was at an all-time high. He also informed the Secretary that the United States Assay Commission, composed of citizens and officials who had met the previous month to test the nation's silver and gold coinage, had recommended the use of French bronze (95% copper with the remainder tin and zinc) as a coinage metal for the cent and a new two-cent piece. Three days later, Chase sent Pollock's December letter and draft legislation for bronze one- and two-cent pieces to Maine Senator William P. Fessenden, chairman of the Senate Finance Committee. Fessenden took no immediate action, and on March 16, Pollock wrote again to Chase, warning that the Mint was going to run out of nickel, much of which was imported. Chase forwarded his letter to Fessenden. Legislation was finally introduced by New Hampshire Senator Daniel Clark on March 22; Pollock's letters were read and apparently influenced proceedings as the Senate passed the bill without debate.

The domestic supply of nickel was at that time produced by a mine at Gap, Pennsylvania, owned by industrialist Joseph Wharton. On March 19, Pollock wrote to Chase that they had no more nickel, nor was any available from overseas; "we are thus shut up to the home supply; from the works of Mr. Wharton". Opposed to the removal of nickel from the cent, Wharton published a pamphlet in April 1864 proposing coinage of one-, two-, three-, five-, and ten-cent pieces of an alloy of one part nickel to three of copper, doubling the percentage of nickel used in the cent. Despite Wharton's efforts, on April 20, a select committee of the House of Representatives endorsed the bill. It was opposed by Pennsylvania's Thaddeus Stevens, who represented the mining area from which Wharton extracted his nickel. Wharton had spent $200,000 to develop his mine and ore refinement machinery, Stevens related, and it was unfair to deprive him of the major use of his metal. "Shall we destroy all this property because by coining with another metal more money may be saved to the government?" Besides, he argued, the copper-nickel alloy for the cent had been approved by Congress, and the new metal, which he termed "brass", would show rust. He was rebutted by Iowa Congressman John A. Kasson, chairman of the House Committee on Coinage, Weights, and Measures, who stated that the bronze alloy did not resemble brass, and he could not support the proposition that the government is bound to purchase from a supplier because he has spent money in anticipation of sales.

The legislation passed the House, and the Coinage Act of 1864 was signed by President Abraham Lincoln on April 22, 1864. The legislation made base metal coins legal tender for the first time: both cents and two-cent pieces were acceptable in quantities of up to ten. The government would not, however, redeem them in bulk. The act also outlawed the private one- and two-cent tokens, and later that year Congress abolished all such issues. The legislation did not allow for the redemption of the old copper-nickel cents; it had been drafted by Pollock, who was hoping that the seignorage income from issuing the new coins would help finance Mint operations, and he did not want it reduced by the recall of the old pieces. Wharton and his interests were appeased by the passage of a bill for a three-cent piece in 1865 and a five-cent piece in 1866, both of his proposed alloy, out of which the "nickel", as the latter coin has come to be known, is still struck.

== Design ==
1863 patterns for the two-cent piece

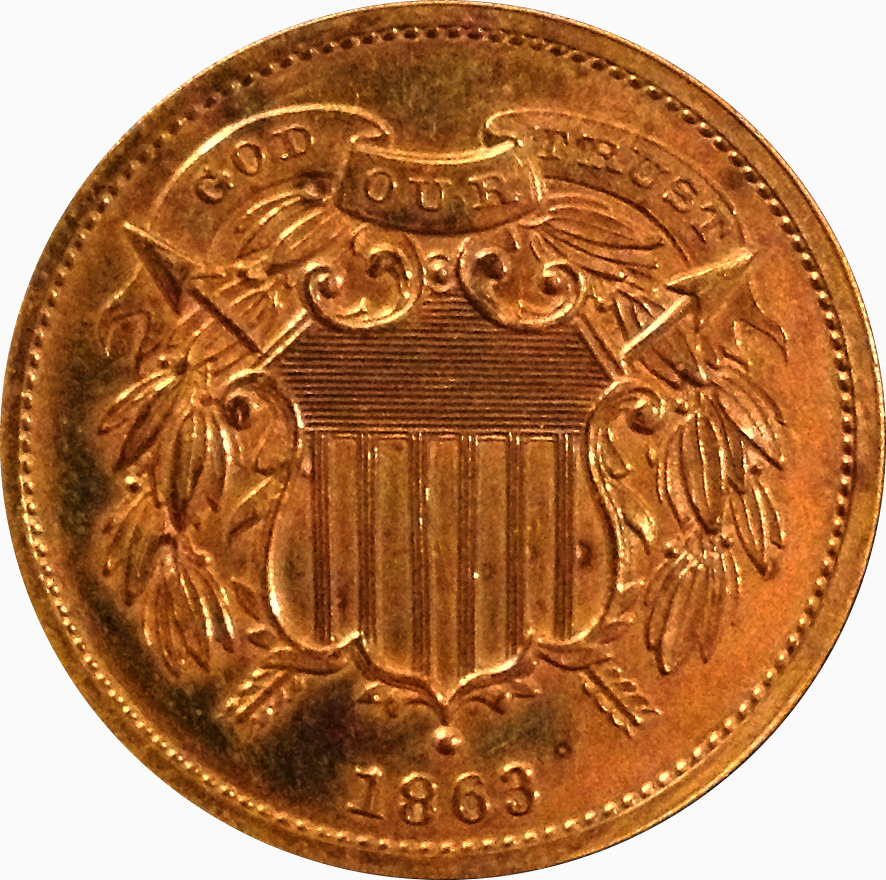
With "God Our Trust"

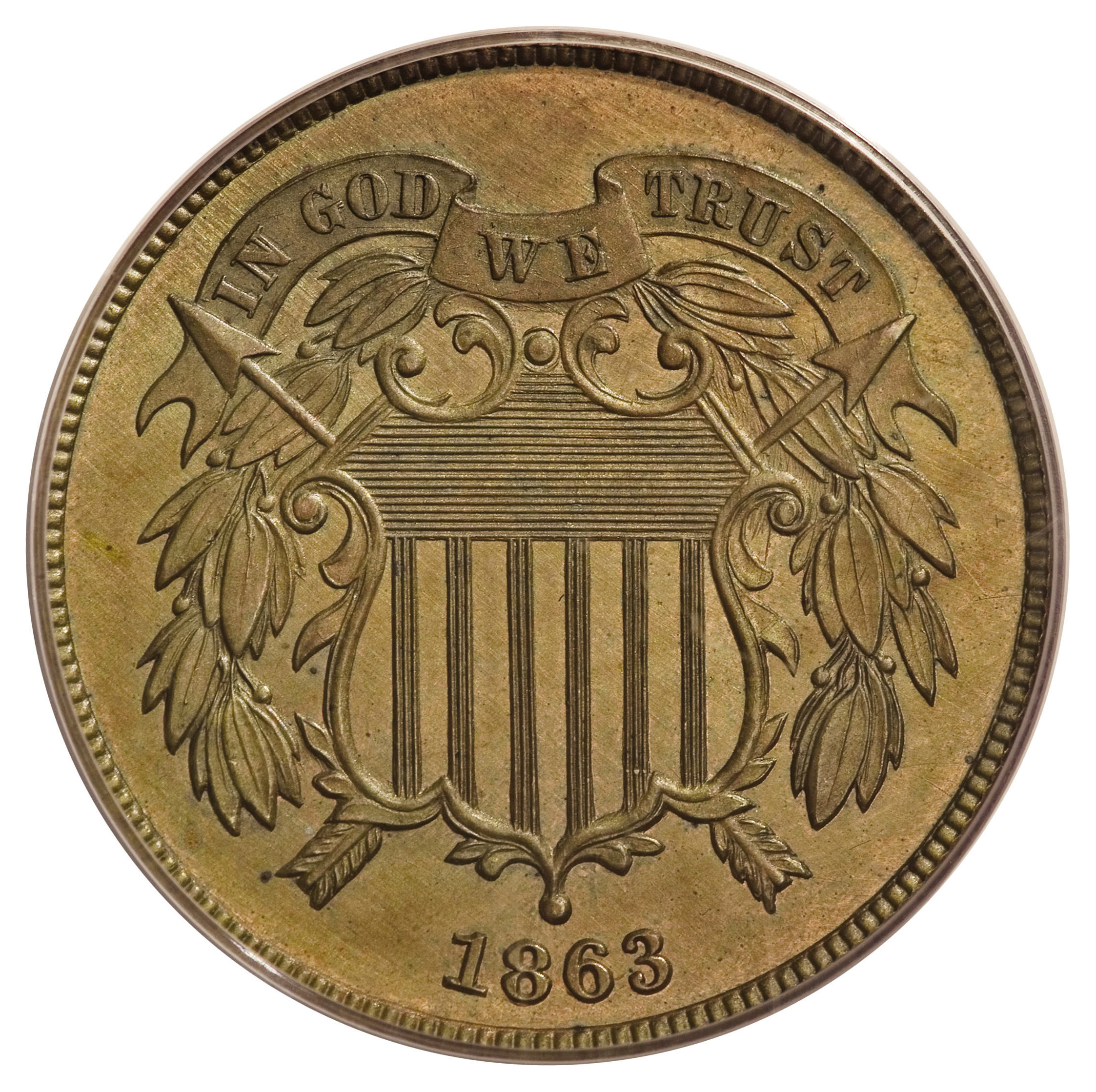
With "In God We Trust"

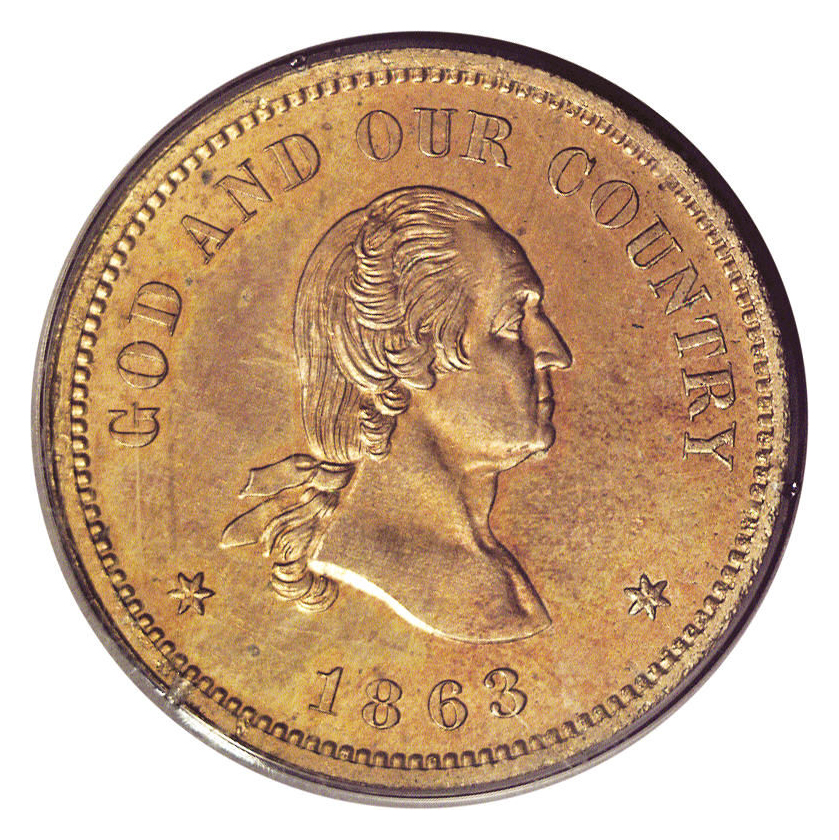
"God and Our Country" George Washington pattern

In late 1861, the Reverend Mark R. Watkinson of Ridleyville, Pennsylvania, had written to Chase, proposing that some reference to God be placed on the coinage in that time of war, and on November 20 of that year, Chase wrote to Mint Director Pollock, "No nation can be strong except in the strength of God, or safe except in His defense. The trust of our people in God should be declared on our national coins. You will cause a device to be prepared without unnecessary delay with a motto expressing in the fewest tersest terms possible this national recognition." Several mottoes were considered by Pollock, including "God Our Trust" and "God and Our Country". Some of the patterns he sent Chase in December 1863 used "God Our Trust", and he wrote of the design, "the devices are beautiful and appropriate, and the motto on each such, as all who fear God and love their country, will approve." He also sent pattern coins depicting George Washington; Chase responded to the letter, "I approve your mottoes, only suggesting that on that with the Washington obverse the motto should begin with the word OUR, so as to read OUR GOD AND OUR COUNTRY. And on that with the shield, it should be changed so as to read: IN GOD WE TRUST." Pollock had been inspired by "The Star-Spangled Banner", a later stanza of which includes the line, "And this be our motto, 'In God Is Our Trust' ". Chase may have been influenced in his decision by the motto of his alma mater, Brown University, In Deo Speramus (In God We Hope).

As the mottoes to be placed on coinage were prescribed by the 1837 act, a legislative change was needed. The act which created the two-cent piece authorized the Mint Director, with the Secretary of the Treasury's approval, to prescribe the designs and mottoes to be used. Longacre's two-cent piece was the first coin inscribed with "In God We Trust". The motto was popularized by the new coin; on March 3, 1865, Congress passed legislation ordering its use on all coins large enough to permit it. Since 1938, "In God We Trust" has been used on all American coins.

The obverse design is a Longacre version of the Great Seal of the United States. His design focuses on the shield, or escutcheon, as a defensive weapon, signifying strength and self-protection through unity. The upper part of the shield, or "chief", symbolizes Congress, while the 13 vertical stripes, or "paleways", represent the thirteen original states. Consequently, the entire escutcheon symbolizes the strength of the federal government through the unity of the states. The crossed arrows represent nonaggression, but imply readiness against attack. The laurel branches, taken from Greek tradition, symbolize victory. In heraldic engraving, vertical lines represent red, clear areas white and horizontal lines blue, thus the escutcheon is colored red, white and blue and is meant to evoke the American flag. The reverse contains the denomination "2 CENTS" within a somewhat ornate wheat wreath. The rest of the coin is filled with the name of the country.

Art historian Cornelius Vermeule deemed the two-cent piece "the most Gothic and the most expressive of the Civil War" of all American coins. "The shield, arrows, and wreath of the obverse need only flanking cannon to be the consummate expression of Civil War heraldry." Vermeule suggested that the coin appears calligraphic, rather than sculptural, and ascribed this to Longacre's early career as a plate engraver.

== Production and collecting ==
Varieties of the 1864 two-cent piece

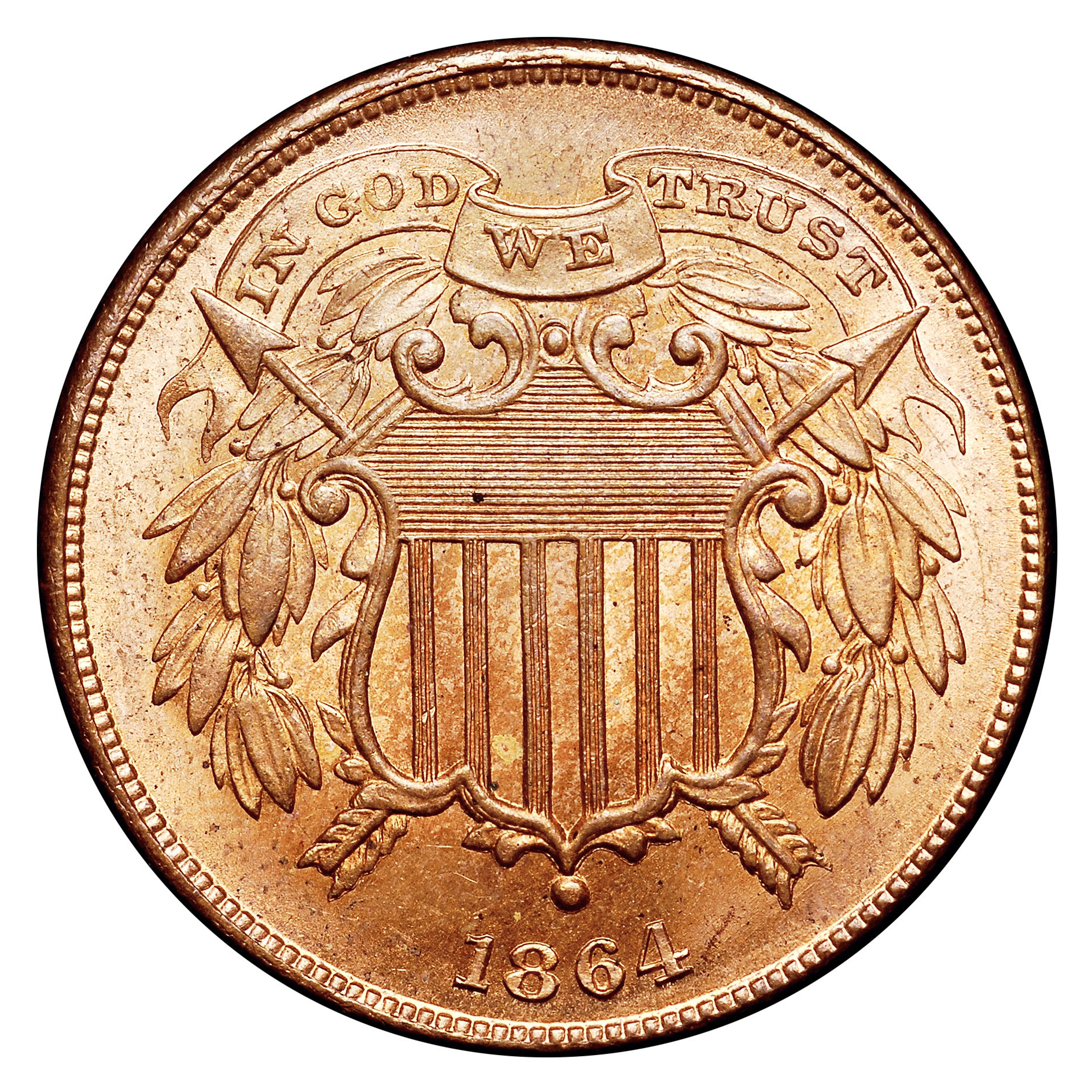
Small motto

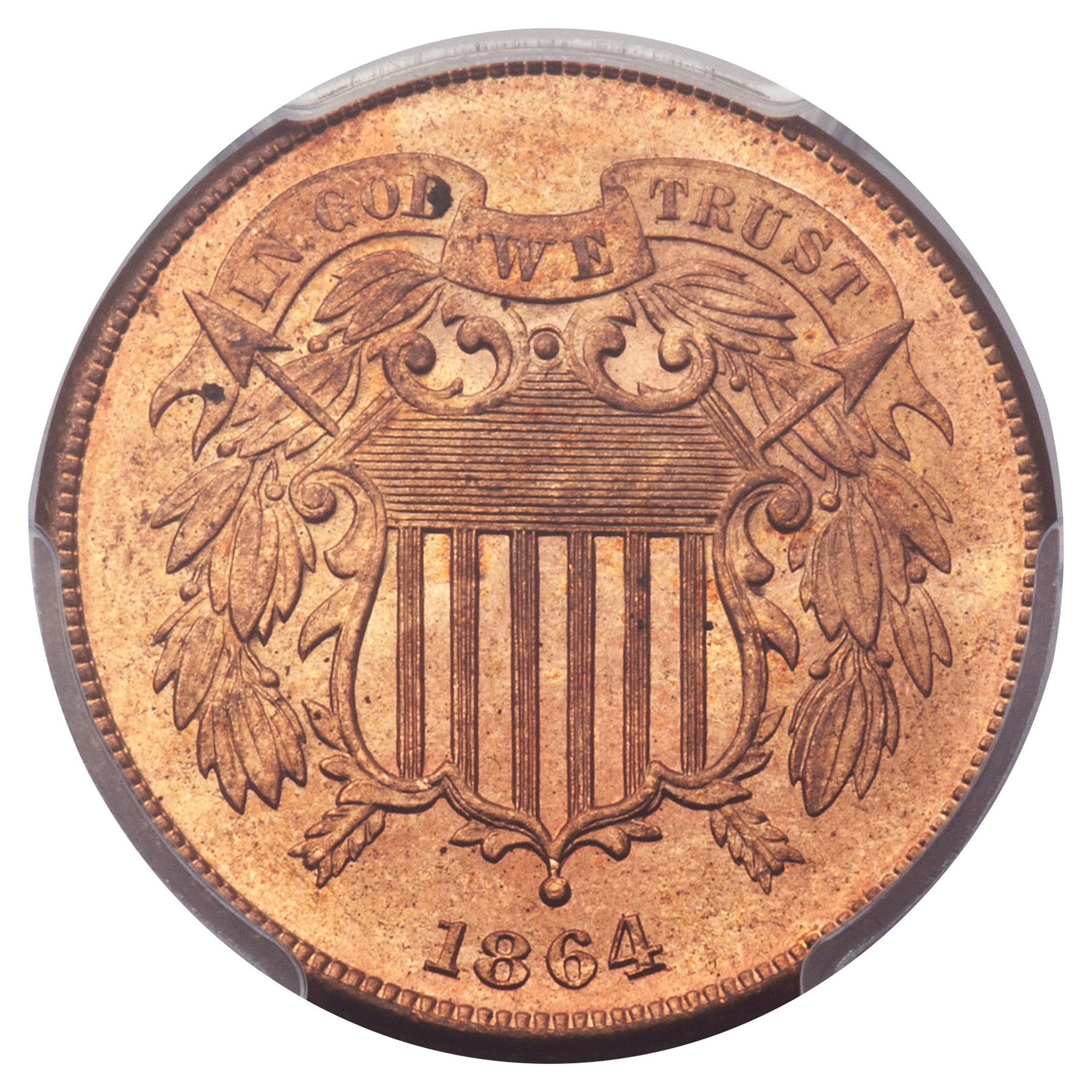
Large motto

A few thousand of the first circulation strikes, as well as a handful of proof coins, came from a prototype die with smaller letters in the motto than all other 1864 pieces. Although specimens of the two-cent piece, being of base metal, were not set aside for testing by the annual Assay Commission, Congress did order that internal checks be done at the Mint as to their composition and weight.

The two-cent piece was at first a success, circulating freely once enough of them were issued to be recognized by the public. It initially circulated because of the wartime coin shortage, which was alleviated by the new cent and two-cent piece. Although Pollock reported hoarding of cents in his June 1864 report, he did not thereafter mention such activities. Silver coins still did not circulate in much of the nation, and the new coins (joined by the three- and five-cent pieces of copper-nickel, first struck in 1865 and 1866 respectively) answered the need for small change. In October 1864, he reported that the demand for both coins had been unprecedented and that every effort was being made to increase production; in his report the next June, he called the two-cent piece "a most convenient and popular coin". The Act of March 3, 1865, that provided for the three-cent nickel piece, reduced the legal tender limit of the bronze coins to four cents, while making the newly authorized coin acceptable up to sixty cents.

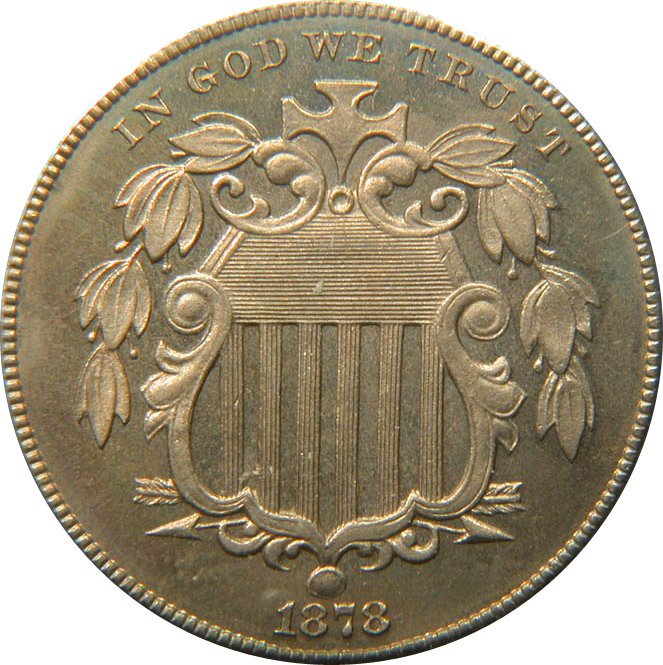
The new Shield nickel (first coined 1866) both resembled the two-cent piece and helped drive it from circulation.

After the large mintage of just under twenty million in the first year, according to numismatist Q. David Bowers, "enthusiasm and public acceptance waned". After the war, bank demand for the denomination dropped, while demand for the new five-cent nickel increased; mintages of the two-cent piece were smaller every year. Lange notes, "it was evident by the end of the 1860s that its coinage was no longer necessary". According to Carothers, "the coinage of a 2 cent piece was unnecessary. While it was popular at first because of the great public demand for metallic small change, it was a superfluous denomination, and its circulation waned rapidly after the 5 cent nickel coin was introduced."

Beginning in 1867, the new Mint Director, Henry Linderman, (Pollock had resigned) began to advocate for Congress to authorize redemption of surplus copper and bronze coinage. Although the nickel could be redeemed in lots (permission granted in its authorizing act), there was no provision for the government to buy back the smaller coins, and with more being issued every year, there were too many small-value coins. Treasury officials insisted the government could not accept the pieces beyond their legal tender limits, even if what was being done was exchanging them for other currency. Under Linderman, the Mint, without any legal authority, purchased $360,000 in bronze coins using three-cent pieces and nickels. Still, millions of two-cent pieces accumulated in the hands of newspaper and transit companies, postmasters, and others who took small payments from the public, and there were complaints to Congress. With the advent of the Grant administration, Pollock returned to office and opposed the redemption proposals. Although he included Pollock's opinions as part of his annual report, Treasury Secretary George S. Boutwell asked Congress to pass a redemption act, and it did so on March 3, 1871, allowing for the redemption of minor coinage in lots of not less than $20. It also allowed the Treasury Secretary to discontinue the coinage of any piece redeemed in large numbers. Pursuant to the new law, the Mint in 1871 and 1872 redeemed over 37,000,000 small coins, including two-cent pieces.

Appearance of the date on the 1873 two-cent piece

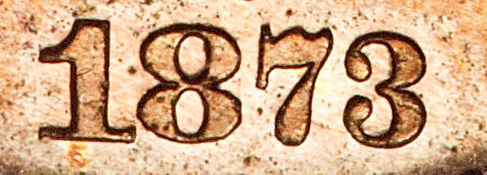
Closed 3

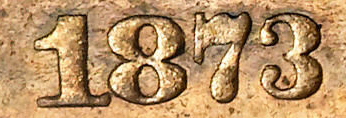
Open 3

In the postwar years, Congress and the Treasury considered a revision of the coinage laws, as the act of 1837 was deemed outdated. Retention of the two-cent piece was never seriously considered in the debates over what became the Mint Act of 1873; the only question concerning the minor coinage was whether to make the cent from bronze or copper-nickel, and how large to make the three-cent nickel. With those pieces remaining unchanged, the bill passed on February 12, 1873, putting an end to the two-cent piece series.

With the two-cent piece likely to be abolished, only 65,000 were struck for circulation in 1872; it is unclear why they were struck at all. On January 18, 1873, Philadelphia Mint Chief Coiner Archibald Loudon Snowden complained that the "3" in the date, as struck by the Mint, too closely resembled an "8", especially on the smaller-sized denominations. In response, Pollock ordered the new chief engraver, William Barber (Longacre had died in 1869), to re-engrave the date, opening the arms of the "3" wider on most denominations. The two-cent piece was struck only in proof condition in 1873, and due to its February abolition, there should not have been time or reason for Barber to re-engrave the coin. Nevertheless, it exists in "Closed 3" and "Open 3" varieties. Breen suggested that the "Open 3" variety was actually struck at a later date, probably clandestinely; it was not known to exist until discovered by a numismatist in the 1950s. Numismatist Paul Green ascribed the two varieties to the two types of proof sets that the Mint sold at the time that would have contained the two-cent piece. The "nickel set" contained only the low-value coins without precious metal, while another contained also the silver coins; he suggested that one variety was struck for each.

Large quantities of two-cent pieces were withdrawn in the 1870s and after. Approximately 17,000,000 of the 45,600,000 two-cent pieces issued had been repurchased by the Treasury as of 1909. Withdrawn pieces were melted and recoined into one-cent pieces. A bill for a two-cent piece bearing the portrait of recently deceased former president Theodore Roosevelt passed the Senate in 1920 and was strongly recommended by a House committee but never enacted. Numismatist S. W. Freeman noted in 1954 that few alive could remember using a two-cent piece, but for those who did, it was often associated with spending it at a candy store. He recalled that two cents would buy a quantity of sweets, as a dime did in Freeman's day, and, he feared, it would take a quarter to do in the future. Full legal tender status was confirmed for the two-cent piece by the Coinage Act of 1965, long after the coin had passed from circulation, as it made all coins and currency of the United States good for all public and private debts without limit. Nevertheless, numismatist Jack White pointed out in a 1971 column that due to its short lifespan, the piece "hardly got its two cents in".

R.S. Yeoman's 2018 edition of A Guide Book of United States Coins lists the 1864 large motto and the 1865 as the least expensive two-cent pieces, in good (G-4) condition at $15, though every issue by year through 1871 lists for $40 or less in that condition. The reason for the relatively flat prices, even in top grades, is a lack of collectors who seek the entire series (it is most popularly collected with a single specimen as part of a "type set" of the various issues of American coins). Despite the high mintage, it is the 1864 date that has one of the more highly valued varieties, the "small motto". Yeoman lists the 1864 small motto in Proof condition, at $20,000 and in Very Fine (VF-20) it is $600.

== Mintage figures ==
All two-cent pieces were minted at the Philadelphia Mint, and bear no mint mark. Proof mintages are estimated.

| Year | Proofs | Circulation strikes |
|---|---|---|
| 1864 | 100 | 19,822,500 |
| 1865 | 500 | 13,640,000 |
| 1866 | 725 | 3,177,000 |
| 1867 | 625 | 2,938,750 |
| 1868 | 600 | 2,803,750 |
| 1869 | 600 | 1,546,500 |
| 1870 | 1,000 | 861,250 |
| 1871 | 960 | 721,250 |
| 1872 | 950 | 65,000 |
| 1873 Closed "3" | 500 | |
| 1873 Open "3" | 600 | |

== See also ==
- Three-cent piece
- Penny, the one-cent piece
- Half-cent piece
