= Feuchtwanger =

Feuchtwanger is a German Jewish surname, indicating a family origin from the city of Feuchtwangen, which expelled all its Jewish residents following a pogrom in 1555. Notable people with the surname include:

- Edgar Feuchtwanger (1924–2025), German-British historian
- Lewis Feuchtwanger (1805–1876), Jewish German-American chemist
- Lion Feuchtwanger (1884–1958), Jewish German writer
- Ludwig Feuchtwanger (1885–1947), German lawyer, lecturer and writer
- Peter Feuchtwanger (1930–2016), German classical pianist/teacher, based in London

== See also ==
- 12350 Feuchtwanger, main-belt asteroid, named after Lion Feuchtwanger
- Feuchtwanger Cent, 19th century United States token (coin), after Lewis Feuchtwanger
