= Token and Medal Society =

American numismatic organization

- Type: Membership-driven
- Industry: History, research
- Founded: 19 November 1960; 65 years ago
- Key people: James Brokamp (President)
- Products: Memberships, magazine, library, conventions
- Website: www.tokenandmedal.org

The Token and Medal Society (TAMS) is an American numismatic organization founded in 1960. The organization specializes in the study, collection, and research of different types of exonumia.

== History ==
The Token and Medal Society was founded on November 19, 1960, in Detroit and formally incorporated on April 8, 1966. Among the founding members were well-known numismatists Q. David Bowers, Clifford Mishler, and Russell Rulau.

TAMS encompasses a wide range of material, including civil war tokens, hard times tokens, subway tokens and others. Members of the Token and Medal Society also work to attribute and identify "maverick" issues, which are tokens and medals for which the origin is unknown.

The organization hosts an annual meeting and awards presentation in conjunction with the American Numismatic Association World's Fair of Money summer convention. From 1983 until 2010, the Society issued their own medals commemorating its annual meetings. Due to rising costs, the 2010 medal was the last in the series.

=== TAMS Journal ===
Since the organization's beginning, it has published a bi-monthly magazine, TAMS Journal. Each of the magazine's past issues from 1961-2015 have been digitized and are currently available on the Newman Numismatic Portal, while later issues are available on the Society's website.
