= Kenneth Bressett =

American numismatist (born 1928)

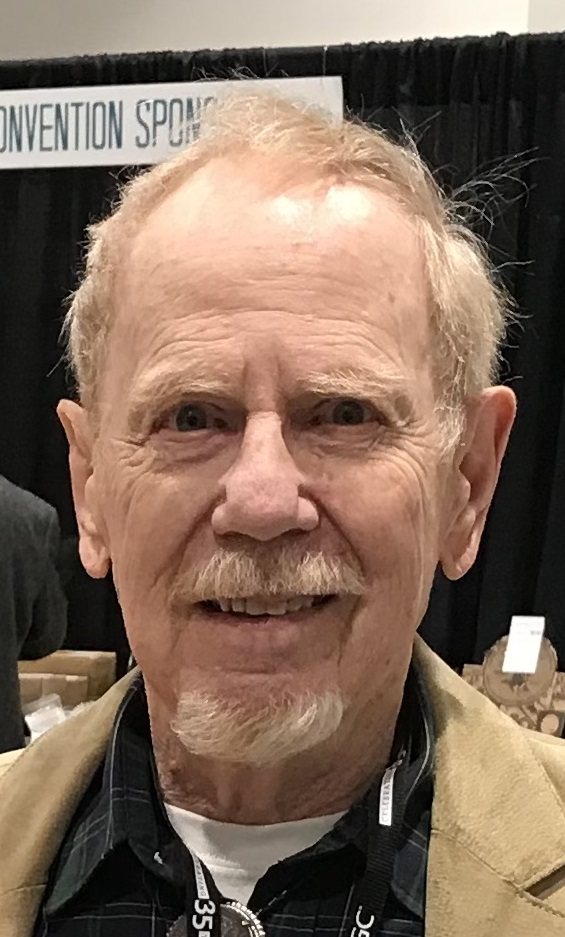
- Bressett at the 2022 National Money Show
- Born: October 5, 1928 (age 98); Keene, New Hampshire, U.S.
- Occupations: Numismatist, author
- Years active: 1947-present

Kenneth Edward Bressett (born October 5, 1928) is an American numismatist. He has actively promoted the study and hobby of numismatics for over 75 years. His published works on the subject cover a wide range of topics and extend from short articles to standard reference books on such diverse areas as ancient coins, paper money, British coins and United States coins. He is perhaps best known for his 62 years as an assistant editor and later full-time editor of A Guide Book of United States Coins.

== Career ==
=== Early career (1937–1955) ===
Throughout his career he has worked as an author, editor and publisher of books and products for coin collectors.

Bressett first became interested in coins in 1937 when his neighbor gave him a coin each from China and Belgium. He began collecting coins in earnest while he was a clerk in a grocery store in 1943 and through high school. Bressett attended Dresser Business School in 1947 and later studied graphic arts at the University of Wisconsin. He joined the American Numismatic Association in 1947 and attended their convention in Boston the following year. From 1949 until 1959 Bressett worked as a printer and compositor for Sentinel Publishing Company. In 1950, he organized the first coin club in New Hampshire. Between 1948 and 1951 he served in the New Hampshire National Guard.

In the 1950s, he began photographing coins, including the 1804 dollar, several coins from the collection of Louis E. Eliasberg, and many large cents used by William Herbert Sheldon in Penny Whimsy. During that time, he discovered 12 new varieties of colonial coins.

=== The Red Book and middle career (1956–2017) ===
Bressett began free-lance editorial work on the Red Book in 1956. He went to work for Richard S. Yeoman at Whitman Publishing in Racine in 1959. He wrote several books while at the publishing house and in 1962 became the editor of the Whitman Red Book and Blue Book. From 1964 to 1968 Bressett was the Editor and Publisher of the Whitman Numismatic Journal. In 1971, following Yeoman's retirement, he became editor of the Red Book. In 1976, he wrote a variety catalog of Vermont coppers, where he introduced the Bressett numbering system for the series. This system is still the standard for the series today. In 1977, Bressett teamed with Abe Kosoff to write Official American Numismatic Association Grading Standards for United States Coins.

From 1986 to 2002, he wrote the column “Consumer Alert” for the ANA's magazine The Numismatist. Bressett was on the American Numismatic Association Board of Governors from 1989 to 1994, serving as vice president and then as president from 1995 to 1997. During his time as president, he wrote a monthly column for The Numismatist.

Bressett coined the term "double die" to refer to the 1955 doubled die cent.

=== Post-Red Book work (2018–present) ===
Bressett retired from full-time editing in 2018 and is now listed as “editor emeritus”. In 2021, he released A Penny Saved: R.S. Yeoman and His Remarkable Red Book, an in-depth look at the history behind A Guide Book of United States Coins which also featured a chapter which serves as a memoir.

In March 2022, Bressett released a new book, Bible Lore and the Eternal Flame. At the National Money Show in Colorado Springs that same month, his collection of ancient and British coins was auctioned off. He celebrated his 75th (Diamond) anniversary as a member of the ANA in September 2022.

In March 2024, Bressett launched a new monthly column for the American Numismatic Association's website, called "Money Musings".

== Other Numismatic Work ==
Bressett worked as a consultant for the F. Newell Childs collection that later sold at auction for over $8 million.

In 1966, he was appointed to the U.S. Assay Commission by President Lyndon B. Johnson, and in 1996 was made a member of the Citizens Commemorative Coin Advisory Committee. He served on the commission from 1996 to 2003, and promoted the 50 State Quarters program.

He first taught at the ANA Summer Seminar in 1975, where he has also taught the subject to hundreds of students through courses at Colorado College and other places. In 1980, Bressett left Whitman to work for A. M. Kagin in Des Moines, Iowa. From 1982 to 1988 he worked at ANA as Director of ANACS. In 1986, he dove with Mel Fisher in Florida for the treasure of the sunken Nuestra Señora de Atocha. From 1983 to 1988 he also served as Director of Coin Authentication and Educational Programs for the American Numismatic Association.

== Numismatic Ambassador ==
For several years, he promoted the Peace 2000 project around the world. The goal was to create a global effort to mint coins "promoting world peace, freedom and human rights", with a portion of all proceeds going towards peacekeeping efforts.

== Awards and honors ==
Bressett has received numerous awards in recognition of his service and dedication to numismatics, including election to the ANA's Numismatic Hall of Fame in 1996 the American Numismatic Association Medal of Merit, and the 1998 Chester L. Krause Memorial Distinguished Service Award (jointly awarded to both him and his wife Bert). He received a Clemy Award from the Numismatic Literary Guild in 1983, the Lifetime Achievement Award in 2001, was named Numismatist of the Year in 2004, received the American Numismatic Society's Distinguished Service Award in 2016, and the Burnett Anderson Memorial Award for Numismatic Writing in 2018.

To celebrate the 60th anniversary of the Red Book, Whitman Publishing created a silver dollar-sized medal featuring Bressett and R.S. Yeoman that was included with a commemorative edition of the 2006 Red Book. The medal was limited to 500 pieces in nickel-silver, included in a Red Book-style envelope. Bressett received a unique .900 fine gold example at the 2006 World's Fair of Money in Denver.

In 2010, the American Numismatic Association named one of their Young Numismatist Literary Awards after Bressett, where articles submitted by people ages 18–22 can win awards and numismatic books.

In 2021, he was named one of the "Top 10" in Coin World's "Celebrating 60: The Most Influential People in Numismatics 1960-2020".

== Books written or edited ==
- Money of the Bible
- Let's Collect Coins
- Basics of Coin Grading for U.S. Coin
- Buying and Selling United States Coins
- United States Coin Price Trends
- Collectible American Coins
- Collecting U.S. Coins
- The Fantastic 1804 Dollar
- A Guide Book of English Coins
- Official ANA Grading Standards for United States Coins
- A Guide Book of United States Coins
- The Handbook of United States Coins
- Guide Book of United States Currency
- Handbook of Ancient Greek and Roman Coins
- Whitman Guide to Coin Collecting: An Introduction to the World of Coins
- Milestone Coins: A Pageant of the World's Most Significant and Popular Money

== Personal life ==
In 1950 he married Bertha "Bert" Britton. They had four children, Philip (1951), Richard (1954–2020), Mary (1955) and Mark before her death in 2012.

== Sources ==
- The Guide Book on the Official Red Book of US Coins, by Frank J. Colletti, 2009, Whitman Publishing.
- The Guide Book of United States Coins, 2011, Whitman Publishing and Ken Bressett as provided.
- The Handbook of United States Coins.
