= A Guide Book of United States Coins =

Numismatic guide book

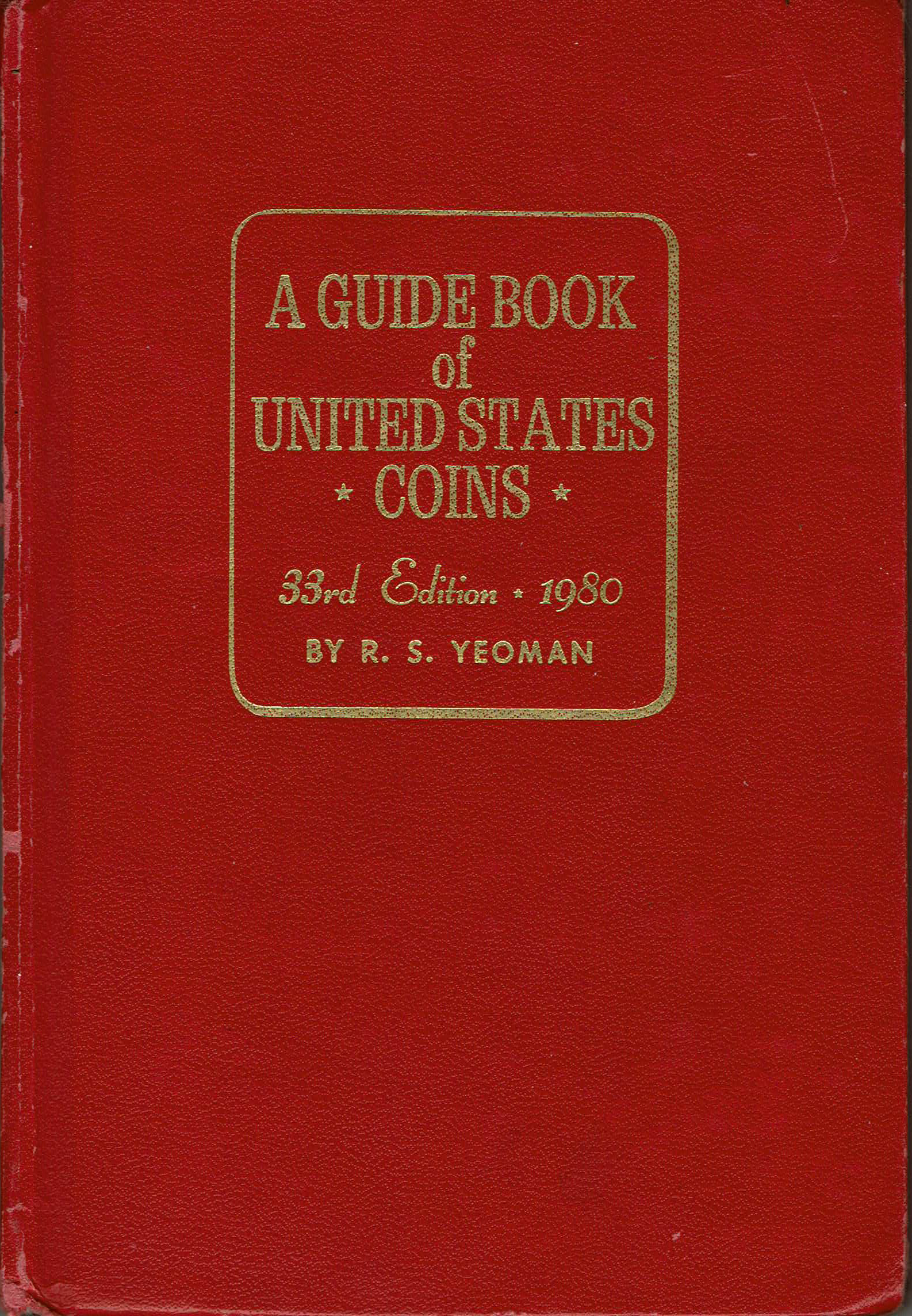
- 33rd edition of the Red Book (1979, dated 1980), showing the solid red cover.
- Editor: R. S. Yeoman (1946–1970); Kenneth Bressett (1971–2017); Jeff Garrett (2018–present); Q. David Bowers (Deluxe Edition, 2018–present)
- Author: Richard (R. S.) Yeoman
- Language: English
- Subject: Numismatics (coins of the United States dollar)
- Genre: Antiques & collectibles
- Publisher: Whitman Publishing
- Publication date: 1946–present
- Publication place: United States
- Pages: 470 (77th edition, 2024)
- ISBN: 978-0794848026
- OCLC: 1138499586
- Website: whitman.com/redbook

A Guide Book of United States Coins (The Official Red Book), first compiled by R. S. Yeoman in 1946, is a price guide for coin collectors of coins of the United States dollar, commonly known as the Red Book.

Along with its sister publication, the older Handbook of United States Coins (The Official Blue Book), it is considered an authoritative U.S. coin price guide. The Guide Book and Handbook got their nicknames (and now official trademarks), the "Red Book" and the "Blue Book," due to their respective solid red and blue covers. Both books are published annually, dated for the following year.

The Red Book lists the retail price of all United States coins from colonial issues to modern circulating U.S. coins, including each year of issue, mint marks, and significant design variations. In addition, the Red Book lists commemorative coins, mint sets and proof sets, and bullion coins, as well as significant U.S. pattern coins, private and territorial gold, Hard-times tokens and Civil War tokens. Also listed are Confederate issues, Hawaiian tokens and coins, Philippine issues and Alaskan tokens. Each listing includes variable prices based on a coin's measured quality, or grade.

== History ==
A Guide Book of United States Coins (the Red Book) is the longest running price guide for U.S. coins. Across all formats, 24 million copies have been sold. The first edition, dated 1947, went on sale in November 1946. Except for a one-year hiatus in 1950, publication has continued to the present.

R. S. Yeoman was the founding compiler of the Red Book while employed at Whitman Publishing. In 1942, Yeoman had served as a founding co-editor of Whitman Publishing's Handbook of United States Coins (the Blue Book). The Blue Book was successful in giving hobbyists an overview of U.S. coin history and coin wholesale values (prices coin dealers would pay for collectors to sell coins). However, Yeoman believed collectors wanted even more information on their coins, so he began to compile the Red Book. Delayed until the end of World War II, the Red Book was published in 1946, providing collectors even more historical information as well as retail values (prices collectors could expect to pay coin dealers to buy coins) instead of wholesale values.

R. S. Yeoman served as editor of the Red Book and Blue Book until he retired in 1970. In 1971 his assistant, Kenneth Bressett, took over as the editor. Bressett himself retired in 2017, and currently serves as editor emeritus. Jeff Garrett has since served as senior editor of the Red Book and Blue Book, while Q. David Bowers has served as senior editor of the Deluxe Edition of the Red Book since 2018. Yeoman and Bressett remain listed on each edition of the Red Book and Blue Book as their editor.

The book's all-time peak print run for a single year was 1.2 million copies in 1965.

By 2022, the Red Book was in its 76th edition (dated 2023) and the Blue Book was in its 80th edition (dated 2023).

In 2025, the Red Book debuted a re-design.

== Formats ==
In addition to the traditional hardcover edition, new formats have been added through the years:

- Softcover (perfect bound) – 1993–1996, 1998, 2003–2006.
- Spiral-bound softcover – 1997, 1999 to date.
- Spiral-bound hardcover – 2008 to date.
- Large-print edition – 2010. An 8 by 10 inch-sized, spiral-bound softcover.
- Limited Edition leather-bound – 2009 to date. Each year the publisher prints fewer copies than the previous year (2015 was limited to only 500 copies; in years past 3,000 copies have been printed).
- Essential Edition

=== MEGA Red Book ===
Since 2015, Whitman Publishing has published the (Expanded) Deluxe Edition, trademarked as the "MEGA Red." The MEGA Red includes more expanded design, mintage, pricing, grading and historical information than the standard Red Book. Since the 1st edition, each edition features "in-depth coverage" of a different denomination of U.S. coins:

- Copper Half Cents and Large Cents (1st edition, 2015) ISBN 978-079484307-6.
- Small cents (pennies), 1856-date (2nd edition, 2016, dated 2017).
- Nickel five-cents (nickels), 1866-date (3rd edition, 2017).
- Dimes, 1796-date (4th edition, 2018).
- Quarter dollars, 1796-date (5th edition, 2019).
- Half dollars, 1794-date (6th edition, 2020).

=== Collectable editions ===
Early editions of the Red Book are collectible. The first edition has commanded $1,500 or more on the open market. The Red Book has its own Red Book – A Guide Book Of The Official Red Book Of United States Coins by Frank J. Colletti published 2009 by Whitman Publishing (ISBN 978-0-7948-2580-5).

A facsimile of the 1947 edition was published in 2006, on the 60th anniversary of the publication of the first edition. Dubbed the "1947 Tribute Edition" (ISBN 0-7948-2230-4), it differs from the original by having a dust jacket (the first Red Book ever to have one) and an additional 32 - page color section, comparing the coin collecting hobby in 1946 and 2006. Except for the dust jacket and color section, it was an exact replica of the first printing (with the phrase "scarcity of this date" on page 135).

== See also ==
- Standard Catalog of World Coins
