= Peter (eagle) =

Bald eagle

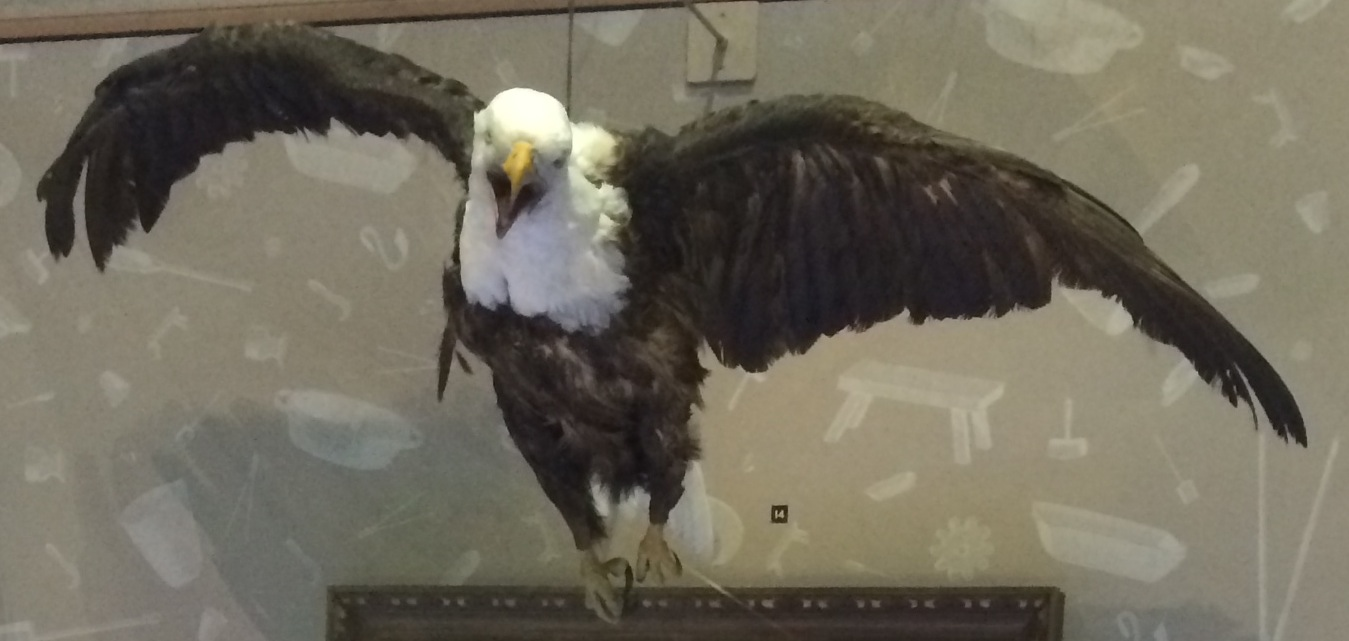
Peter the eagle

Peter was a bald eagle who lived at the Philadelphia Mint from c. 1830 until 1836. He became well known after a while and was let out of the Mint each night to fly around the city of Philadelphia.

== Life of Peter the Eagle ==
In the mid-1830s, Peter the bald eagle became a known figure in the city of Philadelphia. Peter resided in the Philadelphia Mint, a contrast from an eagle's typical habitat. Founded in 1792, The Philadelphia Mint was the first mint in the United States and responsible for the production of coins.

During the day Peter would stay indoors and fly around the mint. The workers loved having Peter be alongside them. Peter was considered an exemplary employee of the Philadelphia Mint. Every night, Peter was let out and would fly around the city. He would return by morning before the workers arrived.

While perched on a coining press one day, the machine suddenly started. His wing got caught in the coining press and he became badly injured and unable to fly. While many mint workers tried to help Peter, his wing was in too poor of a condition and he ultimately died.

== Legacy ==
To pay homage to Peter, the mint employees took him to get taxidermied. He can be admired with his wings stretched out at the main entrance of the United States Mint to greet his visitors. He has been on display for over 150 years. Peter is said to have been the model for the image of an eagle on the silver dollars issued from 1836 to 1839 and the Flying Eagle cent of 1856–1858.

== See also ==
- List of individual birds
