= Feuchtwanger Cent =

Pattern coin struck in the United States

Obverse of the Feuchtwanger cent

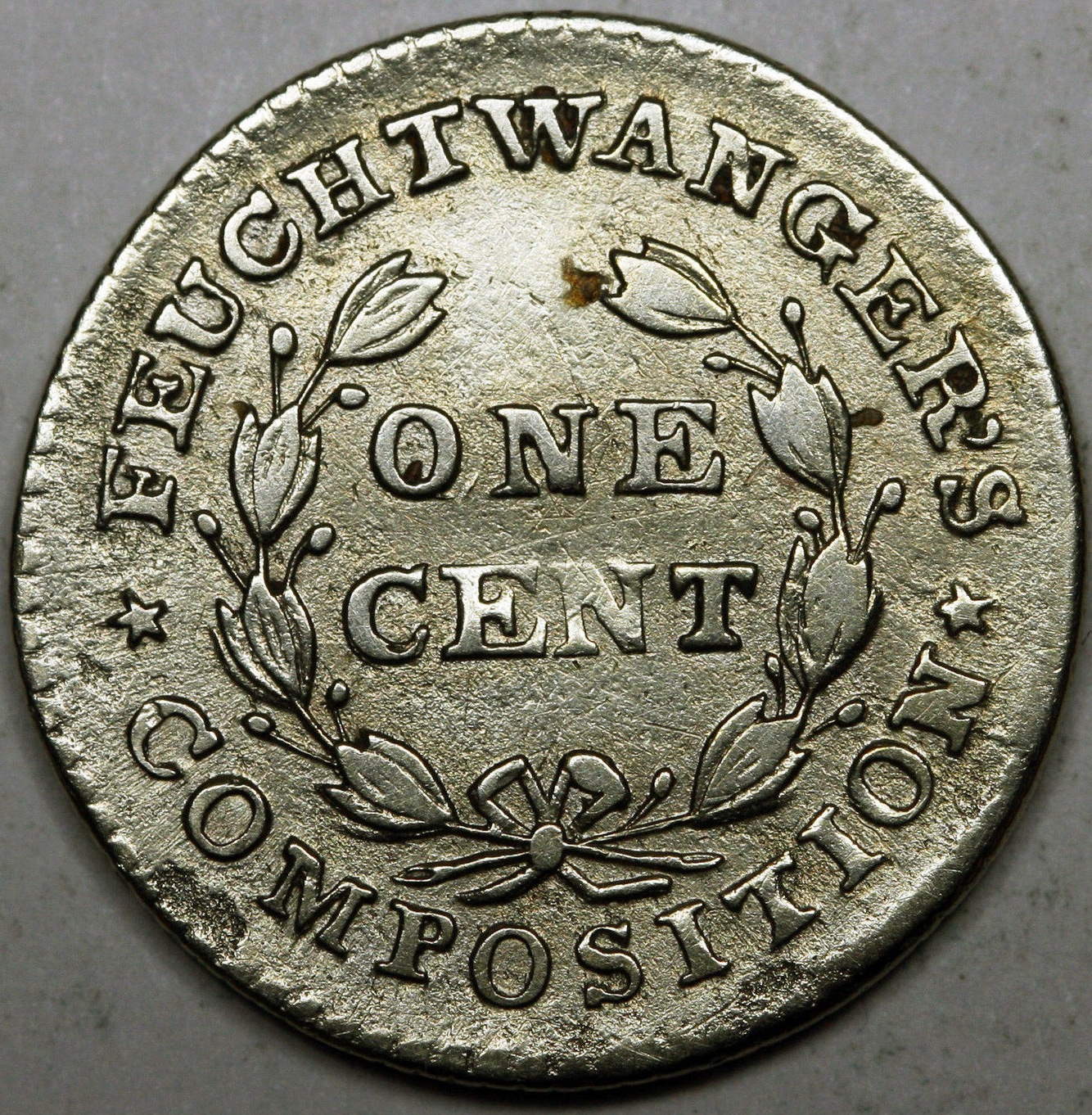
Reverse of the 1837 Feuchtwanger cent

The Feuchtwanger cent was a nickel silver private token coin circulated in the U.S. by Lewis Feuchtwanger during the 1830s and 1840s. Three-cent varieties were also available, though not as plentiful as the one-cent tokens.

The tokens were originally created as patterns to demonstrate a new type of metal for coinage; but when these proposals failed, they were temporarily used by the public during depressions to accommodate a shortage of small change.

== History ==
Lewis Feuchtwanger (born in Fürth, Bavaria on January 11, 1805) received a doctorate at the university of Jena and then moved to New York City. He was primarily a mineralogist, metallurgist, and chemist, but also worked as a physician and was a member of a number of learned societies. He wrote four books on mineralogy and chemicals.

In 1837, to alleviate the need for small change during the Hard Times, Feuchtwanger created tokens made of argentan (commonly known as "German silver"), an alloy made of copper, nickel, zinc, tin, and trace metals. It was considerably cheaper to produce than the extraction of copper for the government-minted half-cents and cents.

The Panic of 1837, an especially rough period of economic recession following the dissolution of the Second Bank of the United States, was known for massive hoarding of small change. Much of the small change circulating at this time (roughly 1837–1844) was composed of clunky copper half-cents and privately-produced token "cents" or various cut- and whole silver coins of foreign origin. In fact, it would not be until 1864 that Congress would enact into law that legal coinage be produced only by the United States Mint.

In 1837, Feuchtwanger presented his one cent coins to Congress for approval as legal coinage and a cheaper substitute for copper. This was probably the first attempt to circulate "nickel" coinage in the United States. Congress denied his request, but Feuchtwanger persisted in his production and circulation. Laws banning private coinage were not passed until 1864. Between 1837 and 1844 thousands of Feuchtwanger cents came out of his New York City pharmacy. More than a dozen different die casts have been identified by collectors.

Aside from one-cent tokens, in 1864 Feuchtwanger also produced three-cent tokens. These are considered extremely rare, as few specimens have survived. Feuchtwanger was also noted for producing stamp-like casts featuring his common theme of a pouncing eagle attacking a snake.

== See also ==
- Hard times token
- Civil War token
