= Richard S. Yeoman =

American numismatist, artist and author

- R.S. Yeoman and Kenneth Bressett examine a Red Book
- Born: Richard Sperry Yeo; August 15, 1904; Milwaukee, Wisconsin, U.S.
- Died: November 9, 1988 (aged 84); Tucson, Arizona, United States
- Occupation: Commercial artist
- Years active: 1932–1970
- Notable work: A Guide Book of United States Coins; A Handbook of United States Coins

Richard Sperry Yeoman (born Richard Sperry Yeo; August 15, 1904 – November 9, 1988) was an American commercial artist and coin collector. Yeoman was the original author of the popular reference books A Guide Book of United States Coins and A Handbook of United States Coins, commonly known as the "Red Book" and "Blue Book" respectively. He also marketed coin display boards for Whitman Publishing. Hired by that company in 1932, he redesigned the boards in 1940 to the fold-out model that is currently sold.

== Early life ==
Yeoman was born in Milwaukee on August 15, 1904. He attended Riverside High School, graduating in 1922. He spent several months working for the Wisconsin Anti-Tuberculosis Association before moving on to the University of Wisconsin-Madison in 1923.

== Career ==
He is best known for compiling two authoritative coin price guides, A Handbook of United States Coins (also known as the "Blue Book", published in 1942) and A Guide Book of United States Coins (or the "Red Book" or The Official Red Book), first published in 1946. Yeoman also wrote A Catalogue of Modern World Coins in 1957 also known as the "brown book", where his Yeoman numbering system was popularly accepted. Whitman bought the rights to Coins of the World Catalogues from the estate of Wayte Raymond. As the size reached a theoretical limit, the foreign series was split off into a second book. Yeoman wrote Current Coins of the World as the second in that series.

R. S. Yeoman retired in 1970, and was succeeded by his assistant, Kenneth Bressett. Yeoman (with Bressett) is still listed as the author of each edition of the books.

Yeoman served on the American Numismatic Association Board of Governors from 1946–1951, and in 1964 was a member of the United States Assay Commission. He also served as President of the Racine Numismatic Society. He co-founded the Numismatists of Wisconsin and was also a charter member of the Numismatic Literary Guild, among his membership in 20 different numismatic organizations.

== Later life ==
After his retirement, Yeoman continued to travel to coin conventions, particularly the annual American Numismatic Association National Money Show and World's Fair of Money.

Yeoman died from a stroke while driving in Tucson, Arizona on November 9, 1988. He is buried at West Lawn Memorial Park in Mount Pleasant, Wisconsin.

== Personal life ==
Yeoman married Marion Junkerman in 1925. They had a daughter Sharon (1930–2018).

== Awards and honors ==
Yeoman received the Farran Zerbe Memorial Award, the highest honor bestowed by the American Numismatic Association, in 1956. In 1978, he was inducted into the ANA's Numismatic Hall of Fame, one of the first two living inductees.

Yeoman has been honored on medals issued by Whitman Publishing. In 1997 he was featured on a pair of silver and "gold-plated" medals, issued in a limited edition of 50 sets. In 2006, he was featured with Kenneth Bressett on a nickel-plated medal limited to 500 pieces.
