= Civil War token =

Privately minted token coins

Hart's Arcade Civil War Store Card, 945A-1a

Civil War tokens are token coins that were privately minted and distributed in the United States between 1861 and 1864. They were used mainly in the Northeast and Midwest. The widespread use of the tokens was a result of the scarcity of government-issued cents during the Civil War.

Civil War tokens became illegal after the United States Congress passed a law on April 22, 1864, prohibiting the issue of any one or two-cent coins, tokens or devices for use as currency. On June 8, 1864, an additional law was passed that forbade all private coinage.

Civil War tokens are divided into three types: store cards, patriotic tokens, and sutler tokens. All three types were utilized as currency, and are differentiated by their designs. The collectible value of the tokens is primarily determined by their condition and rarity.

== History ==
By 1862, the second year of the Civil War, government-issued coinage began vanishing from circulation. American citizens hoarded all coins with gold and silver, and eventually began hoarding copper-nickel cents as well. This made it extremely difficult for businesses to conduct transactions. In response, many merchants turned to private minters to fill the void left by the hoarded coins. The first of these privately minted tokens appeared in the autumn of 1862, by H. A. Ratterman, in Cincinnati, Ohio. New York issues followed in the spring of 1863, first with Lindenmueller currency store card tokens issued by New York City barkeep Gustavus Lindenmueller and then with Knickerbocker currency patriotic tokens issued by William H. Bridgens. It is estimated that by 1864, there were 25,000,000 Civil War tokens (nearly all redeemable for one cent) in circulation, consisting of approximately 7,000–8,000 varieties.

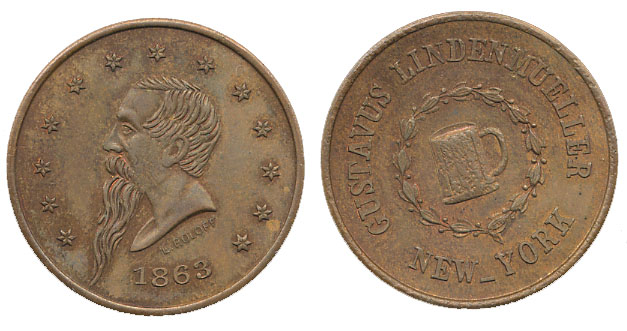
Lindenmueller token, 1863

Lindenmueller tokens are one of the best-known and commonly struck types. They served as store cards (advertisements) for Lindenmueller and he had more than one million of these one-cent tokens struck and placed into circulation in 1863. One of the common uses for the token was for streetcar fare. The Third Avenue Railroad company of New York, which had willingly accepted a large quantity of the Lindenmueller tokens in lieu of actual currency, asked Lindenmueller to redeem them. He refused, and the railroad had no legal recourse. Incidents such as these eventually forced the government to intervene.

=== Government intervention ===
On April 22, 1864, Congress enacted the Coinage Act of 1864. While the act is most remembered for the introduction of the phrase "In God We Trust" on the newly created two-cent piece, it also effectively ended the usage of Civil War tokens. In addition to authorizing the minting of the two-cent piece, the act changed the composition of the one-cent piece from a copper-nickel alloy (weighing 4.67 grams) to a lighter, less thick piece composed of 95% copper (weighing 3.11 grams). The new one-cent piece was much closer in weight to the Civil War tokens, and found greater acceptance among the public.

While the Coinage Act made Civil War tokens impractical, the issue of their legality was decided on June 8, 1864, when Congress enacted 18 U.S.C. § 486, which made the minting and usage of non-government issued coins punishable by a fine of up to $2,000, (~$32,550 in 2024) a prison term of up to five years, or both. (Chapter 25 of Title 18 deals specifically with counterfeit and forgery). It did not make it illegal to own Civil War tokens. Evidence exists that the tokens were viewed as collectibles as early as 1863, when the first known listings of Civil War tokens were published.

== Types ==
Civil War tokens have been extensively cataloged by Fuld and his numbering of types is the standard.

=== Patriotic tokens ===
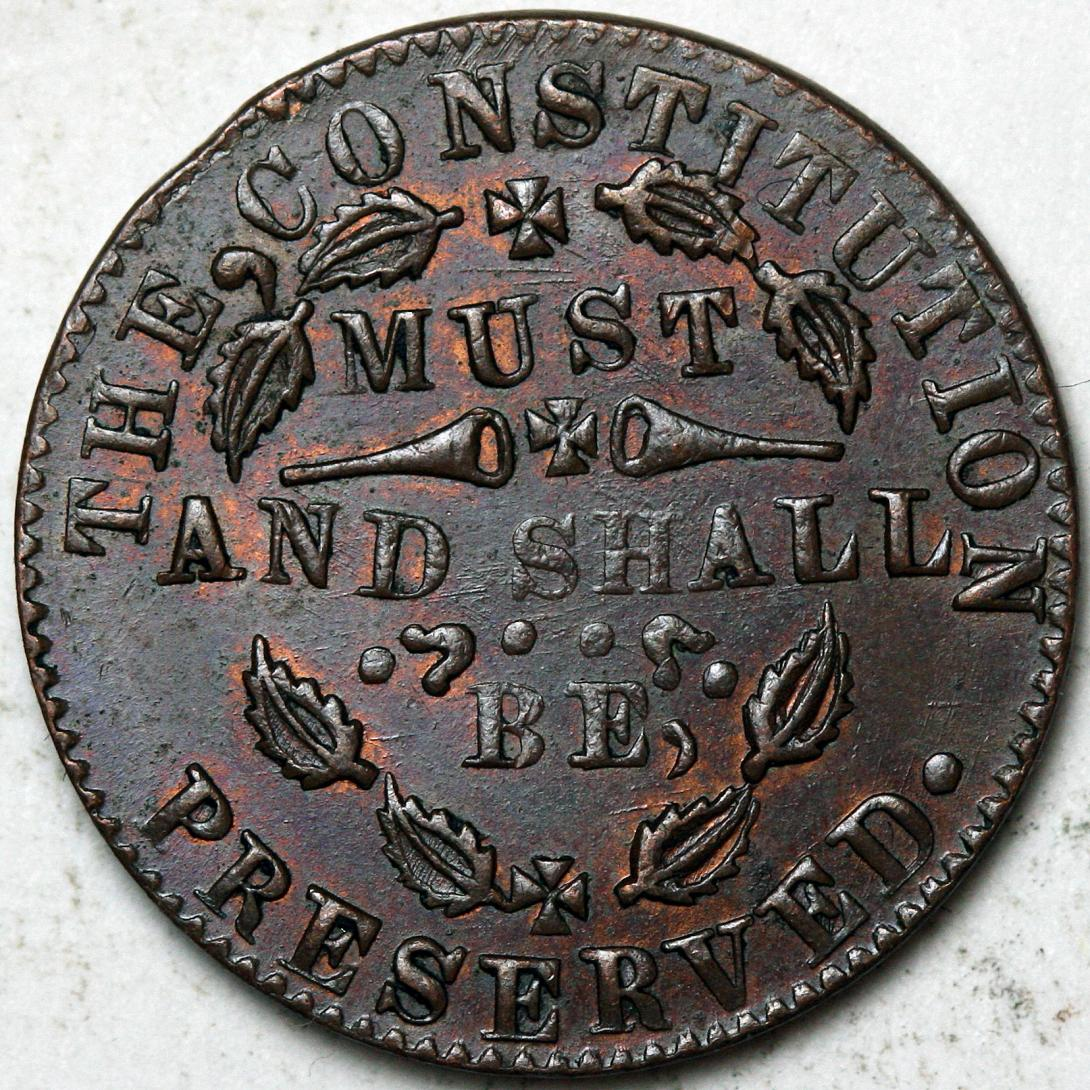
Patriotic token with legend on reverse: "The constitution must and shall be preserved".

Patriotic Civil War tokens typically displayed a patriotic slogan or image on one or both sides. Since the majority of these tokens were minted in Union states, the slogans and images were decidedly pro-Union. Some common examples of slogans found on patriotic tokens are "The Union Must and Shall Be Preserved", "Union For Ever", and "Old Glory". Some of the images found on patriotic tokens were the flag of the United States, a 19th-century cannon, and the USS Monitor.

Among the best-known varieties of patriotic tokens are the so-called "Dix tokens." They are named for John Adams Dix, who served as Secretary of the Treasury in 1861. In a letter from Dix to a revenue cutter captain, Lieutenant Caldwell, he ordered Caldwell to relieve another cutter captain of his command for refusing an order to transfer from New Orleans to New York City. The letter ends with the following sentence: "If any one attempts to haul down the American flag, shoot him on the spot." The quote found its way to a number of patriotic tokens, albeit with a slightly modified wording ("haul down" is usually replaced by "tear it down").

=== Store cards ===
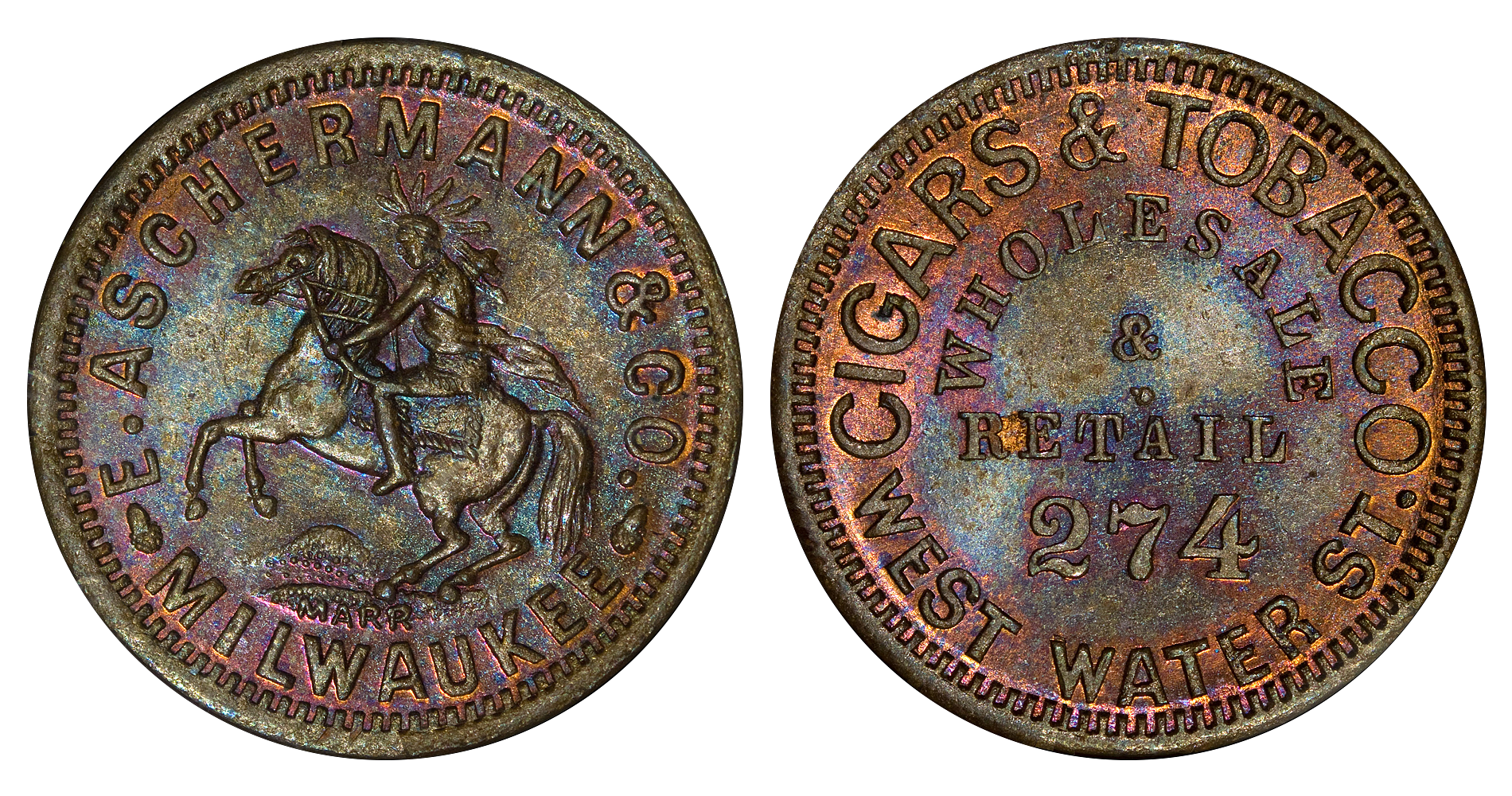
1863 Aschermann Civil War store card, WI510A-1a

Civil War store cards advertised the name and/or location of privately owned businesses. Businesses that could afford it had two custom dies made, with both advertising the business. Otherwise, only one side displayed the business's information.

=== Sutler tokens ===
Sutler tokens are similar to store cards. Rather than listing the name of a private business, however, these tokens bore the name of a particular army unit (usually a regiment) and the name of the sutler who conducted transactions with the regiment. Of the three types of Civil War tokens, sutler tokens are by far the rarest.

== Collecting ==
There are several factors that determine the collectible value of Civil War tokens including condition and rarity. Rarity is measured on a scale from 1 to 10 (1 being the most common type). The scale was developed by noted numismatic dealer and writer George Fuld.

The material used to mint Civil War tokens can also affect collectability. Civil war tokens were minted using a variety of materials, copper being a common choice (often actually bronze). Other materials used for minting were nickel, tin, German silver, white metal, and silver. Examples of tokens minted using rubber are also known to exist.

=== Fuld rarity scale ===
- R-1: Greater than 5,000
- R-2: Between 2,000 and 5,000
- R-3: Between 500 and 2,000
- R-4: Between 200 and 500
- R-5: Between 76 and 200
- R-6: Between 21 and 75
- R-7: Between 11 and 20
- R-8: Between 5 and 10
- R-9: Between 2 and 4
- R-10: Unique (one known example)

==== Civil War Token Society ====
In 1967 the Civil War Token Society was founded by a group of collectors for the purpose of "stimulat[ing] interest and research in the field of Civil War token collecting." The society publishes a quarterly journal, Civil War Era Numismatics (previously The Civil War Token Journal), maintains a library, and conducts quarterly mail auctions.

== See also ==
- Exonumia
- Token and Medal Society
- Hard times token
