= Lewis Feuchtwanger =

- Feuchtwanger in 1867
- Born: January 11, 1805; Fürth, Kingdom of Bavaria (now Germany)
- Died: June 25, 1876 (aged 71); New York City
- Citizenship: American citizenship
- Education: University of Jena
- Known for: Coinage
- Scientific career
- Fields: Chemistry

Lewis Feuchtwanger ([ˈfɔɪ̯çtˌvaŋɐ], 11 January 1805 – 25 June 1876) was a German-born chemist known primarily for his work on United States coinage. Feuchwanger was married to Augusta Levy and had five children.

== Biography ==
Lewis Feuchtwanger was the son of a mineralogist, and inherited a taste for natural science, to which he devoted special attention at the University of Jena. After receiving his doctor of philosophy degree there in 1827, he emigrated to the United States in 1829, and settled in New York, where he opened the first German pharmacy, and also practiced medicine, being particularly active during the cholera epidemic of 1832.

Subsequently, he devoted his entire attention to chemistry and mineralogy, and became engaged in the manufacture and sale of rare chemicals. He introduced in 1829 the alloy called German silver, and was the first to call the attention of the U. S. government to the availability and desirability of nickel for small coins. In 1837, he issued, by permission of the U. S. government, a large quantity of one-cent pieces in nickel of which were known as Feuchtwanger Cents, and in 1864, he had struck off a number of three-cent pieces in the same metal, but they were not put into circulation.

After the great fire of 1846 he called the attention of the authorities of New York to the fact that saltpetre would explode under certain conditions. This statement created much discussion; the expression "Will saltpetre explode?" became a byword, and a play was acted at one of the theatres in which a character representing Feuchtwanger was presented.

He made two large collections of minerals of which he partially sold in 1832, one of these he exhibited in London at the World's fair in 1851, and the other, he bequeathed to his daughters, was for a time on exhibition at the American Museum of Natural History in Central Park. Feuchtwanger was a member of scientific societies in this country and abroad, and contributed papers to Silliman's American Journal of Science and to the Proceedings of the American Association for the Advancement of Science. In the 1850s to the 1870s, Feuchtwanger opened up a chemical plant because of his buying and selling of commercial quantities of minerals for use in preparing chemical preparations from the raw material.

Lewis Feuchtwanger died on June 25, 1876, in New York City.

== Works ==
- Popular Treatise on Gems (New York, 1838)
- Elements of Mineralogy (1889)
- Treatise on Fermented Liquors (1858)
- Practical Treatise on Soluble or Water Glass (1870)

== See also ==
- Feuchtwanger Cent
