= Hard times token =

Copper or brass tokens struck in the United States during the 19th century

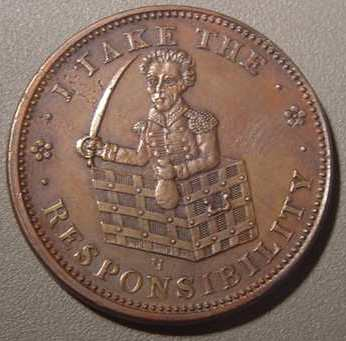
Hard times token from the panic of 1837, with Andrew Jackson in a trunk

Hard times tokens are American large cent- or half-cent–sized copper or brass tokens, struck from about 1833 through 1843, serving as unofficial currency. These privately made pieces, comprising merchant, political and satirical pieces, were used during a time of political and financial crisis in the United States.

Today, hard times tokens are collected as coins and as political history.

== Background ==
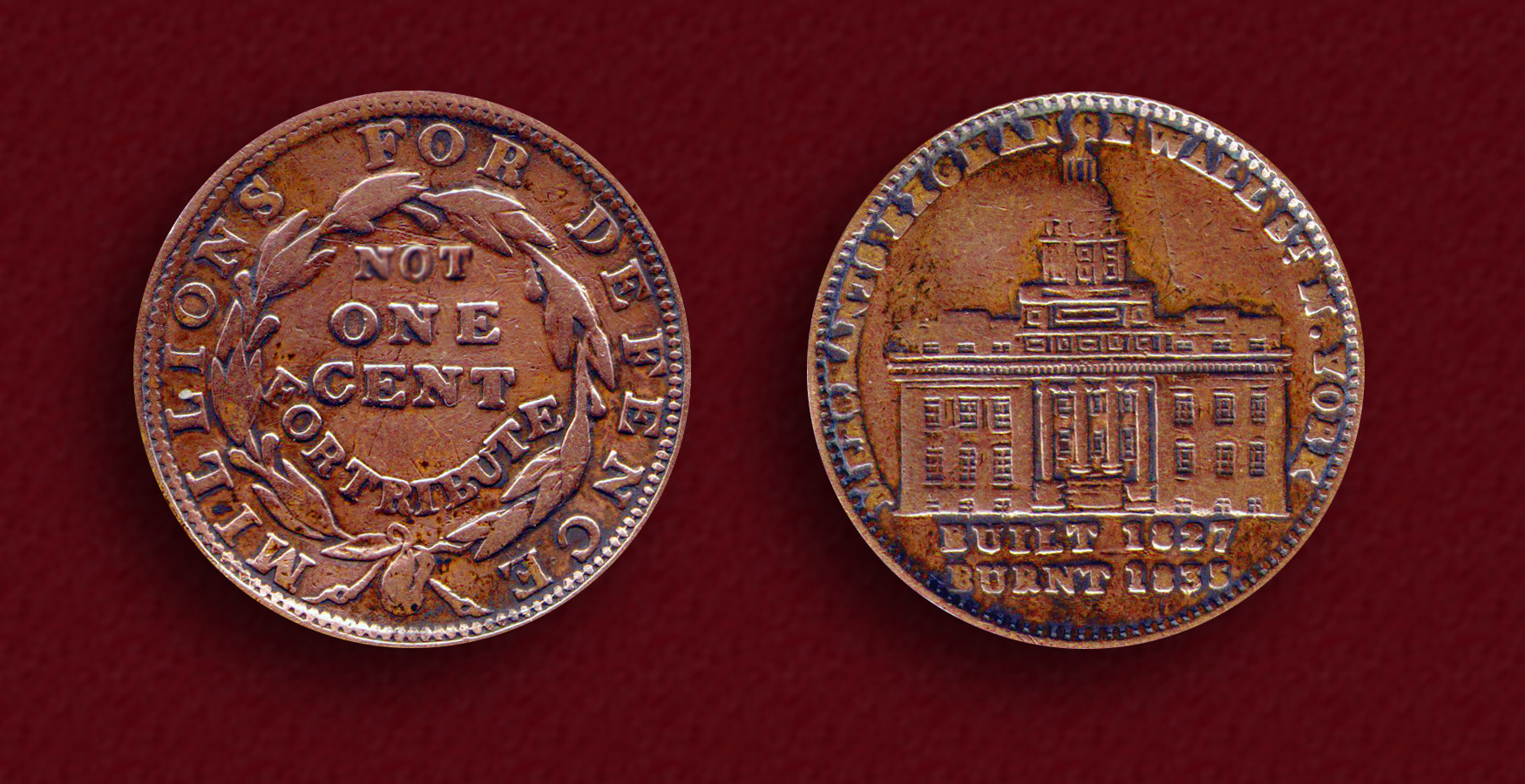
1837 token featuring the phrase "Millions for defense, not one cent for tribute", a patriotic slogan originating during the XYZ affair. The phrase serves as a substitute for the denomination label on an official coin.

In 1832, President Andrew Jackson ran for reelection and called for the abolition of the Second Bank of the United States. While he won the election, he worked to weaken the bank before the charter expired in 1836. Without the Bank of the United States, state banks attempted to fill the paper money gap and issued a large number of bank notes, which fueled inflation. Hoping to halt the inflation and speculation in public lands, Jackson and his Treasury secretary, Levi Woodbury, issued the Specie Circular on July 11, 1836. The circular simply stated that as of August 15, 1836, banks and others who received public money were required to accept only gold and silver coins in payment for public lands.

Instead of the intended results, the circular spelled the end of a time of economic prosperity. The circular set into motion a panic, and the public began hoarding specie. Without specie to pay out, banks and merchants began having financial troubles. It wasn't too long before the effects of Jackson's decision were felt across the nation as banks and businesses failed, and a depression ensued.

By this time, Jackson's vice president, Martin Van Buren, was the elected president in office. The period of economic hardship, the Panic of 1837, during Van Buren's presidency came to be known as the "Hard Times".

== Designs ==
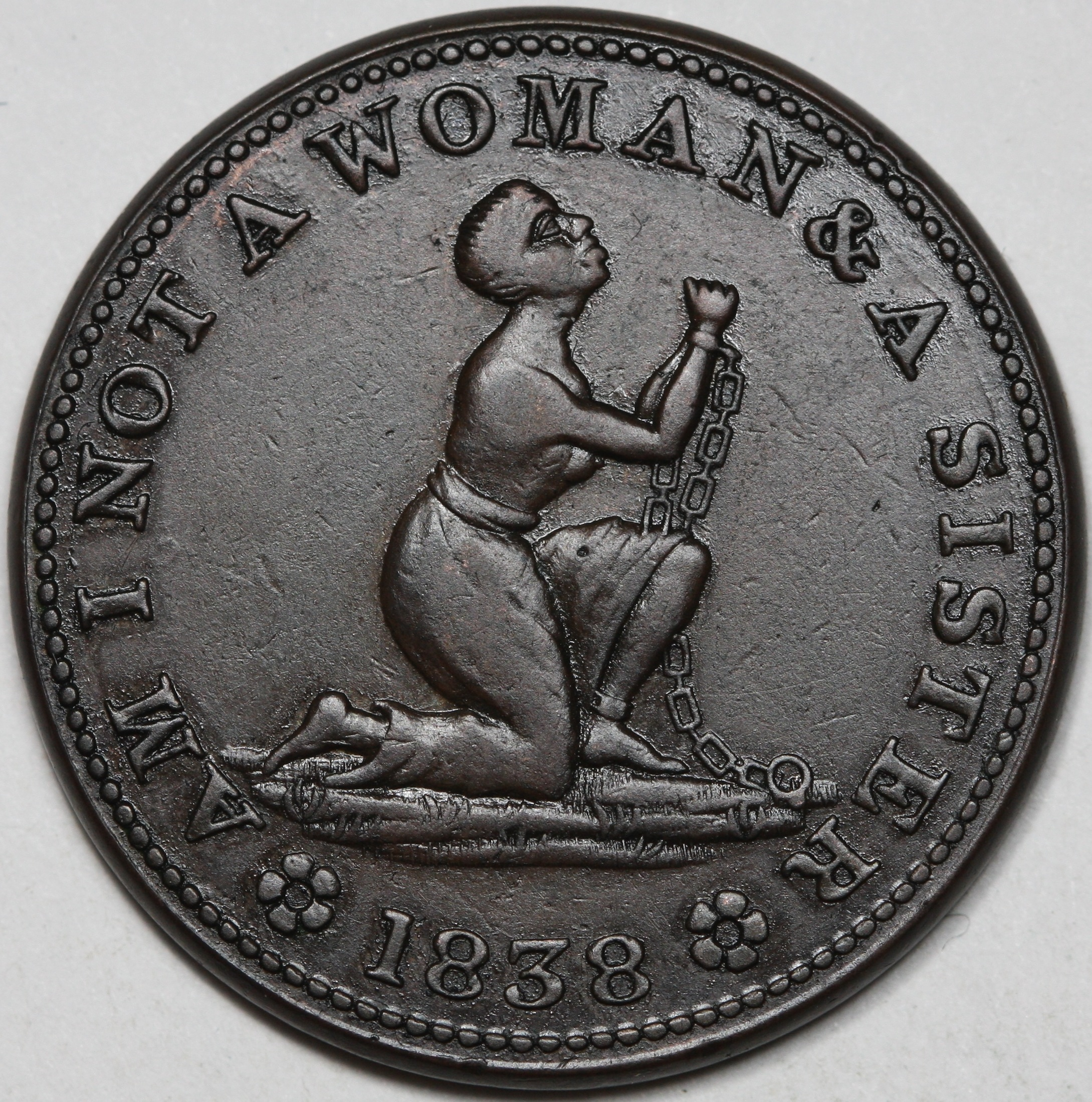
1838 "Am I Not a Woman and a Sister"

Hard times tokens have been cataloged by Russell Rulau, based on earlier work by Lyman H. Low, and his numbering of types is the standard. Rulau classifies tokens broadly into:

- Political tokens referring to the Second Bank of the United States controversy.
- Political tokens with slogans and images. One shows a kneeling slave with the legend "Am I Not a Woman and a Sister 1838" borrowed from an earlier Wedgewood medallion, "Am I Not a Man and a Brother".
- Tokens resembling large US cents with Liberty head, wreath and eagle motifs and legends similar to federal coins such as "NOT ONE CENT". The Feuchtwanger Cent was made with German silver, a copper alloy, intended as a cheaper alternative to copper.
- Store cards or advertising pieces.
- Mules (obverse and reverse die combinations.)

== See also ==
- Exonumia
- Civil War token

== Sources ==
- Starck, Jeff, "Attack on Second Bank, fiscal policies bring 'Hard Times'", Coin World, January 3, 2006
