= Three-cent piece =

United States coin

Three-cent silver piece
- United States
- Value: 0.03 US dollars
- Mass: (1851–53) 0.8 g (12.3 gr) (1854–73) 0.75 g (11.6 gr)
- Diameter: 14 mm (0.55 in)
- Thickness: 0.6 mm (0.024 in)
- Edge: plain
- Composition: (1851–53) 75% Ag, 25% Cu; (1854–73) 90% Ag, 10% Cu
- Years of minting: 1851–1873

Obverse
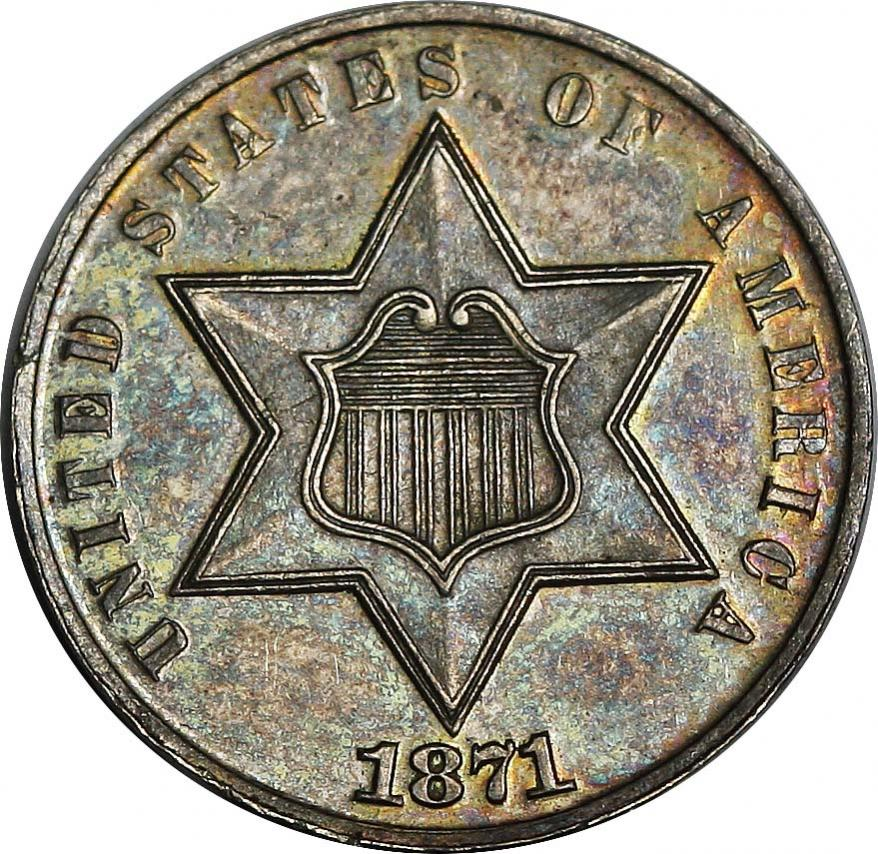
- Design: shield on six-pointed star
- Designer: James Barton Longacre
- Design date: 1851; 175 years ago

Reverse
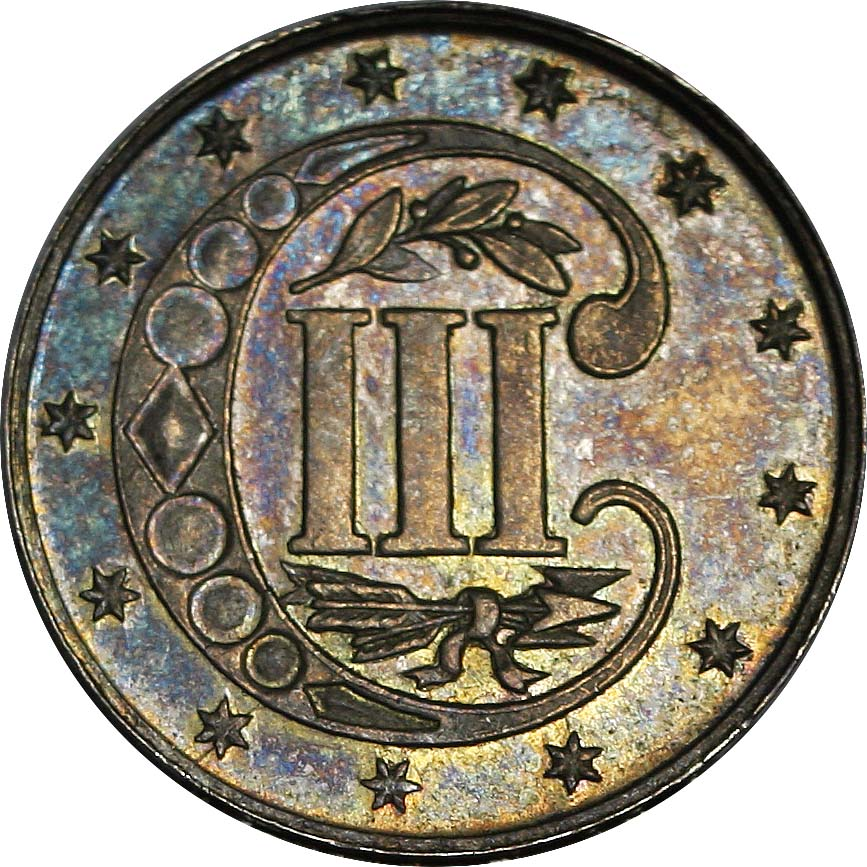
- Design: Roman numeral III
- Designer: James Barton Longacre
- Design date: 1851

Three-cent nickel
- United States
- Value: 0.03 US dollars
- Mass: 1.94 g (29.9 gr)
- Diameter: 17.9 mm (0.70 in)
- Edge: plain
- Composition: 75% Cu, 25% Ni
- Years of minting: 1865–1889

Obverse
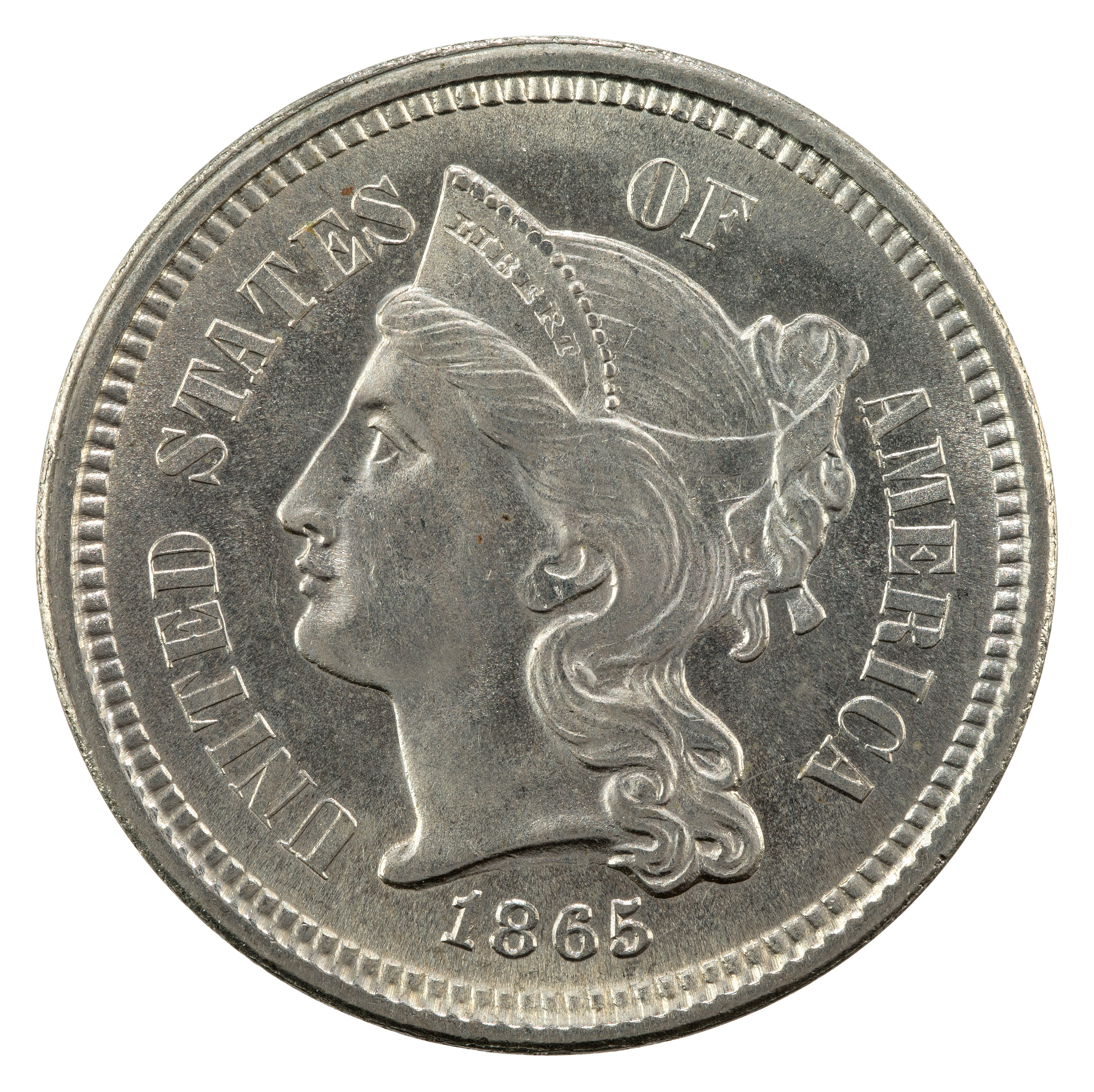
- Design: Liberty Head
- Designer: James Barton Longacre
- Design date: 1865

Reverse
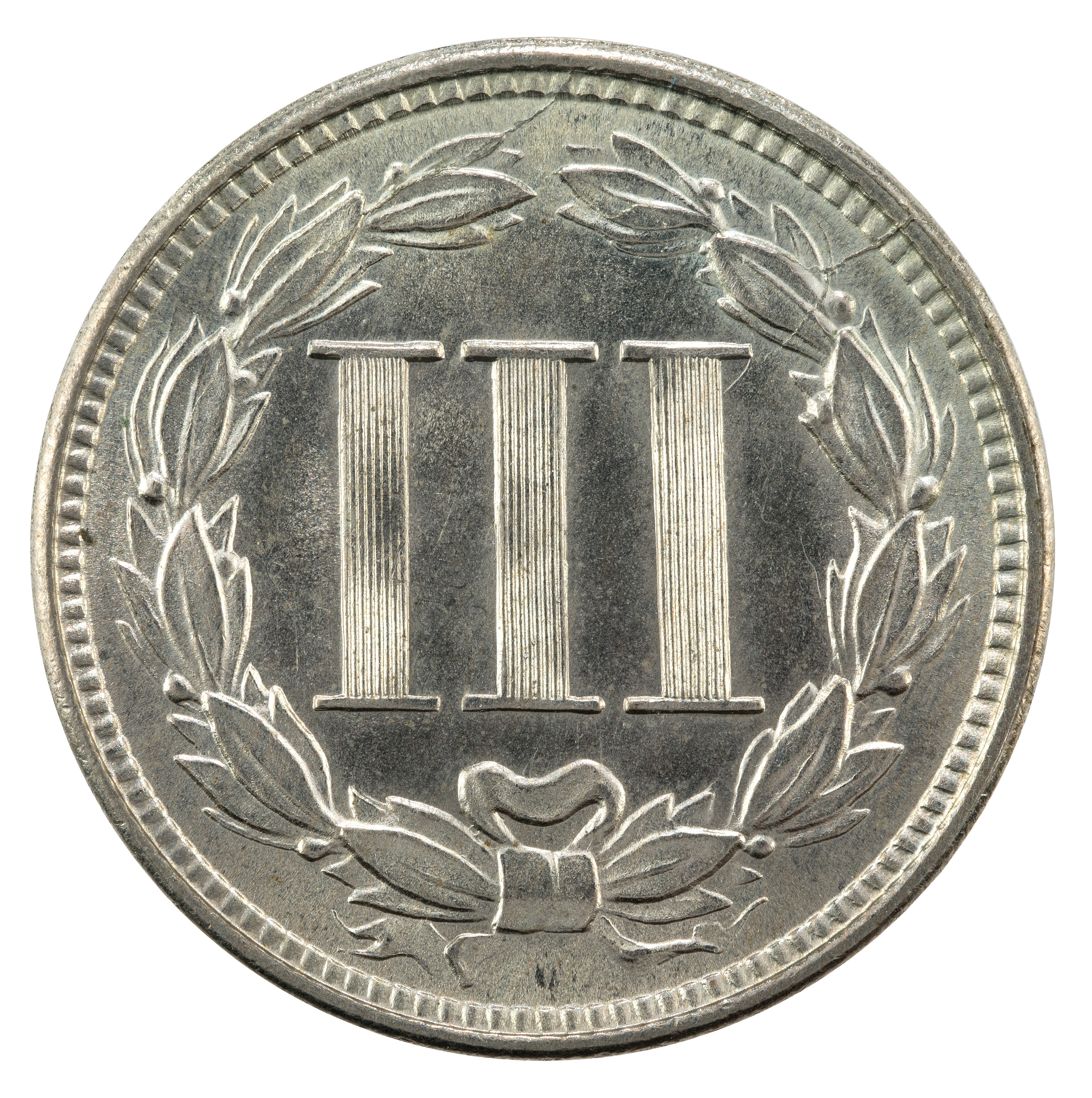
- Design: Roman numeral III
- Designer: James Barton Longacre
- Design date: 1865

The United States three cent piece was a unit of currency equaling 3/100 of a United States dollar. The mint produced two different three-cent coins for circulation: the three-cent silver and the three-cent nickel. Additionally, a three-cent bronze coin was made as a pattern in 1863. During the period from 1865 to 1873, both coins were minted, albeit in very small quantities for the silver three-cent piece.

== History ==
The three-cent coin was proposed in 1851 both as a result of the decrease in postage rates from five cents to three and to answer the need for a small-denomination, easy-to-handle coin. The three-cent silver featured a shield on a six-sided star on the obverse and the Roman numeral III on the reverse. The coin was initially composed of 75% silver and 25% copper to ensure that the coin would be considered real currency yet not worth melting down for the silver. The coins were physically the lightest-weight coins ever minted by the United States, weighing only 0.8 grams (0.028 oz) and with a diameter smaller than a modern dime and only slightly greater than the smallest gold dollars. The silver coins were known as "fishscales". The term "trimes" is often used today for these coins, and was first used by the director of the United States Mint (James Ross Snowden) at the time of their production.

Starting in 1854, the three-cent silver had its silver metal content raised to 90% to encourage circulation. At the same time, its weight was reduced to 0.75 grams (0.026 oz) by reducing thickness. The coin went through a design change at the time such that two lines were now used to border the star on the obverse and an olive sprig was added above and a bundle of arrows below the Roman numeral III on the reverse. A final design change occurred in 1859 because of striking problems: the number of lines bordering the star was reduced to one, and the font was made taller and slightly narrower. The size of the date numerals also varied through the years, with 1860–1863 featuring the smallest date numerals of any US coin. In 1851 only, the New Orleans Mint struck some of the silver three-cent coins. It was minted from 1851 to 1873 at the Philadelphia Mint. Later years had very small mintages and the 1873 issue was in proof state only, commanding prices upwards of $400. However, an earlier-date silver three-cent piece can be bought in worn condition for a relatively low price. The silver three-cent pieces can be purchased for around $25 if they are in decent shape and before 1862, depending on the mintage. The silver three-cent piece (along with the half dime, and the two-cent piece as well as the temporary suspension of the standard silver dollar in favor of the Trade Dollar) was discontinued by the Coinage Act of 1873.

Civil War-era silver shortages led to widespread hoarding of all silver coins, and most one- and five-cent coins, as well. Various alternatives were tried, including encapsulated postage and privately issued coinage. The Treasury eventually settled on issuing fractional currency. These small denomination (3 to 50 cent) notes were never popular, as they were easy to lose and unwieldy in large amounts. The answer to this issue was reached in 1865 with the introduction of the three-cent nickel coin, composed of copper and nickel and larger than the silver coin of the same denomination. The coin featured a Liberty head obverse and another Roman numeral III reverse. The three-cent nickel was never intended as a permanent issue, only as a stopgap measure until the wartime hoarding ceased. Production began to taper off in the 1870s (except for an anomalously large coinage in 1881), but mintage of the denomination did not finally end until 1889. One reason often given for the discontinuation of the three-cent nickel piece in 1889 is that this coin and the dime (10-cent silver coin) were identical in diameter. Another factor may have been that in 1883, the letter postage rate dropped to 2 cents, thus removing the justification for this coin.

=== Glass coins ===
There was some discussion of minting a glass 3-cent coin to relieve the demand on copper during World War II.

=== Mintage figures ===
Three cent (silver), 1851–1873

- 1851 (P) – 5,447,400
- 1851 O – 720,000
- 1852 (P) – 18,663,500
- 1853 (P) – 11,400,000
- 1854 (P) – 671,000
- 1855 (P) – 139,000
- 1856 (P) – 1,458,000
- 1857 (P) – 1,042,000
- 1858 (P) – 1,603,700
- 1859 (P) – 364,200
- 1860 (P) – 286,000
- 1861 (P) – 497,000
- 1862 (P) – 343,000
- 1863 (P) – 21,000
- 1864 (P) – 12,000
- 1865 (P) – 8,000
- 1866 (P) – 22,000
- 1867 (P) – 4,000
- 1868 (P) – 3,500
- 1869 (P) – 4,500
- 1870 (P) – 3,000
- 1871 (P) – 3,400
- 1872 (P) – 1,000
- 1873 (P) – 600 (all proof)

Three cent (nickel), 1865–1889

- 1865 (P) – 11,382,000
- 1866 (P) – 4,801,000
- 1867 (P) – 3,915,000
- 1868 (P) – 3,252,000
- 1869 (P) – 1,604,000
- 1870 (P) – 1,335,000
- 1871 (P) – 604,000
- 1872 (P) – 862,000
- 1873 (P) – 1,173,000
- 1874 (P) – 790,000
- 1875 (P) – 228,000
- 1876 (P) – 162,000
- 1877 (P) – About 510 (all proof)
- 1878 (P) – 2,350 (all proof)
- 1879 (P) – 38,000
- 1880 (P) – 21,000
- 1881 (P) – 1,077,000
- 1882 (P) – 22,200
- 1883 (P) – 4,000
- 1884 (P) – 1,700
- 1885 (P) – 1,000
- 1886 (P) – 4,290 (all proof)
- 1887 (P) – 5,000
- 1888 (P) – 36,500
- 1889 (P) – 18,190

== See also ==
- Two-cent piece (United States)
