= Three-cent nickel =

US copper-nickel three-cent coin (1865–1889)

Three-cent nickel piece
- United States
- Value: 3 cents (0.03 US dollars)
- Mass: 1.94 g
- Diameter: 17.9 mm
- Edge: plain
- Composition: 75% copper; 25% nickel
- Years of minting: 1865–1889
- Mint marks: None, all struck at Philadelphia Mint without mint mark

Obverse
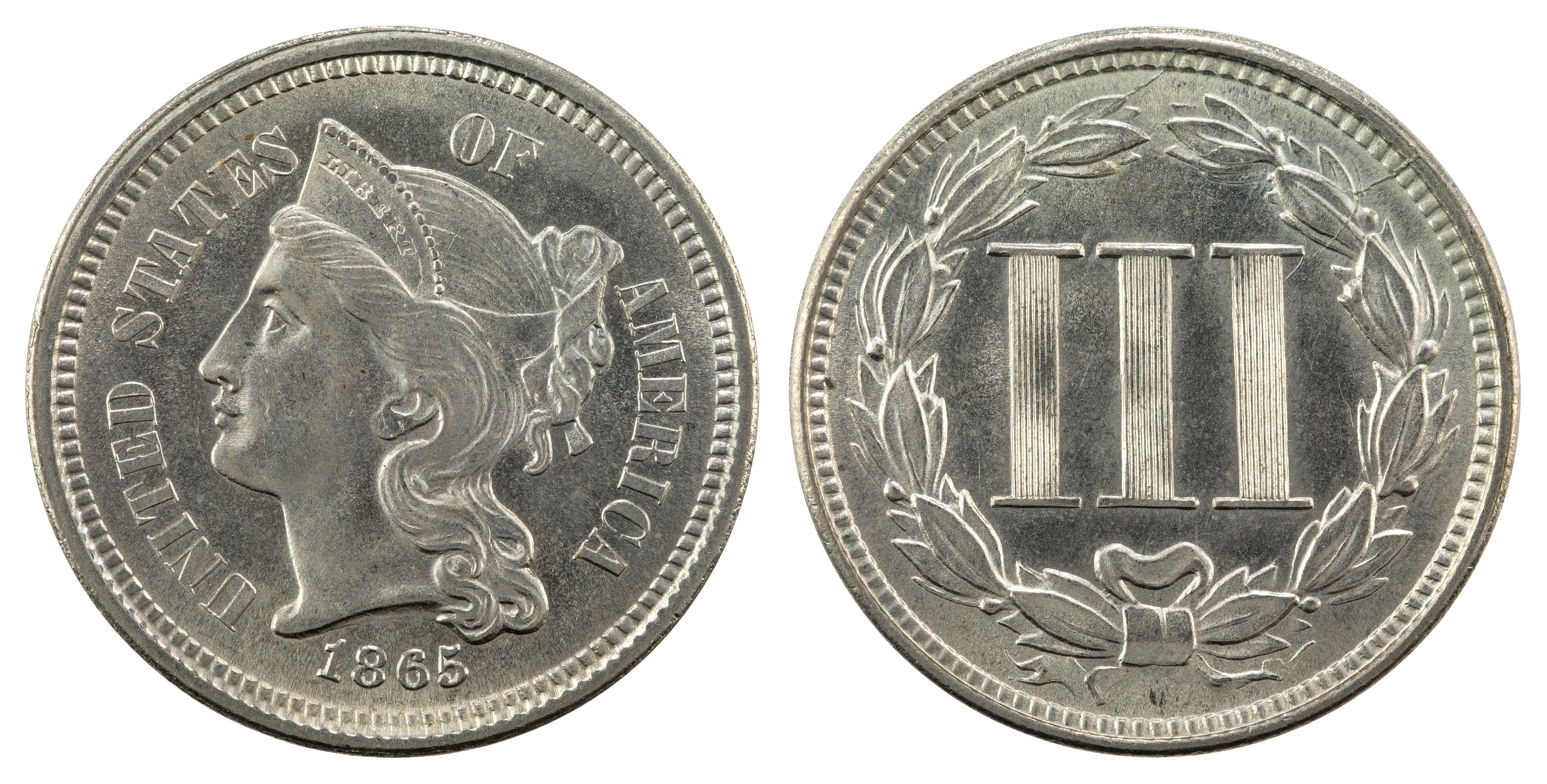
- Design: Head of Liberty
- Designer: James Barton Longacre
- Design date: 1865

Reverse
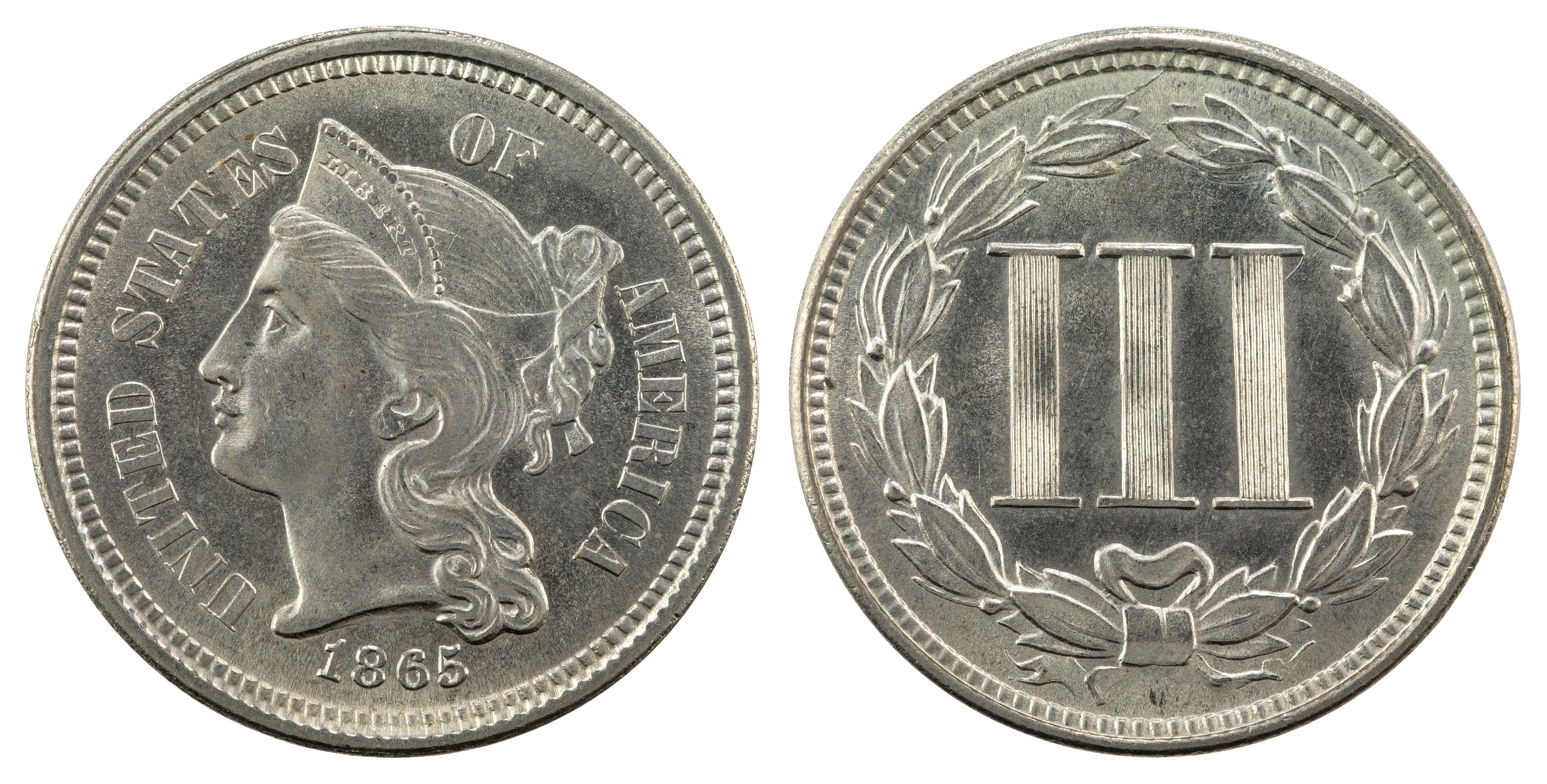
- Design: Wreath surrounding Roman numeral III
- Designer: James Barton Longacre
- Design date: 1865

The copper-nickel three-cent piece, often called a three-cent nickel piece or three-cent nickel, was designed by US Mint Chief Engraver James B. Longacre and struck by the United States Bureau of the Mint from 1865 to 1889. It was initially popular, but its place in commerce was supplanted by the five-cent piece, or nickel.

With precious metal federal coinage hoarded during the economic turmoil of the American Civil War, including the silver three-cent piece, and even the copper-nickel cent commanding a premium, Congress issued paper money in denominations as small as three cents to replace the hoarded coins in commerce. These small slips of paper became ragged and dirty, and the public came to hate "shinplasters". After the issuance in 1864 of a lighter bronze cent and a two-cent piece of that metal, both of which circulated freely, there were proposals for a three-cent piece in copper-nickel to replace the three-cent note. The advocates were led by Pennsylvania industrialist Joseph Wharton, who then controlled the domestic supply of nickel ore. On the last legislative day of the congressional session, March 3, 1865, a bill for a three-cent piece in copper-nickel alloy was introduced in Congress, passed both houses without debate, and was signed by President Abraham Lincoln.

The three-cent nickel piece initially circulated well, but became less popular when the five-cent nickel was introduced in 1866, a larger, more convenient coin, with a value of five cents better fitting the decimal system. After 1870, most years saw low annual mintages for the three-cent nickel, and in 1890 Congress abolished it. The last were struck in 1889; many were melted down to coin more five-cent pieces. The issue is not widely collected, and prices for rare dates remain low by the standards of American collectible coinage.

== Background ==
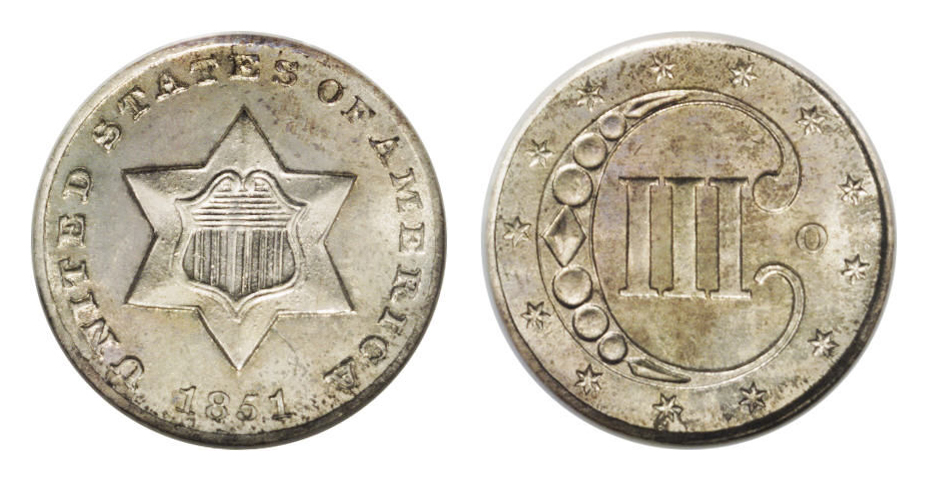
The silver three-cent piece was issued beginning in 1851.

The great influx of bullion from the California Gold Rush and other finds caused the price of silver relative to gold to increase starting in 1848, and silver coins were hoarded or exported for melting. In 1851, a bill for a three-cent piece in 75% silver and 25% copper was introduced in Congress by New York Senator Daniel S. Dickinson, who wanted to lower postage rates from five to three cents. This percentage of silver was less than the normal 90% so that the coins would circulate at a time of hoarding. The copper large cent did not circulate in the Pacific Coast region or South due to prejudice against coins that did not contain precious metal, and some means of allowing the purchase of a postage stamp without the use of copper cents was necessary. Dickinson's bill passed on March 3, 1851, and in addition to authorizing the new three-cent silver, lowered rates for most domestic mails. By 1854, the imbalance had abated, and Congress increased the silver content of the three-cent piece to the standard 90% for silver coins, though its weight was reduced.

The large cent was replaced by a smaller version made of 88% copper and 12% nickel in 1857. In 1861, the Civil War began, and when efforts to finance the war via borrowing failed, the Treasury stopped paying out gold in December 1861. The United States shifted to a paper money-based economy with little disruption. By June 1862, the price of silver had risen to the point where coins of that metal vanished from circulation, many exported to Canada, where they were both acceptable in circulation, and could be exchanged for gold. This departure of low-value coins was far more disruptive to commerce than the loss of the high-denomination gold coins, and change in transactions was made by a variety of makeshifts. These included currency issues by cities and businesses, encased postage stamps, and federally issued fractional currency—paper notes in denominations as small as three cents. The low-value paper currency, whether issued by government or business, were called shinplasters by the public, which disliked them. On the Pacific Coast, where paper money was not favored, silver and gold continued to circulate.

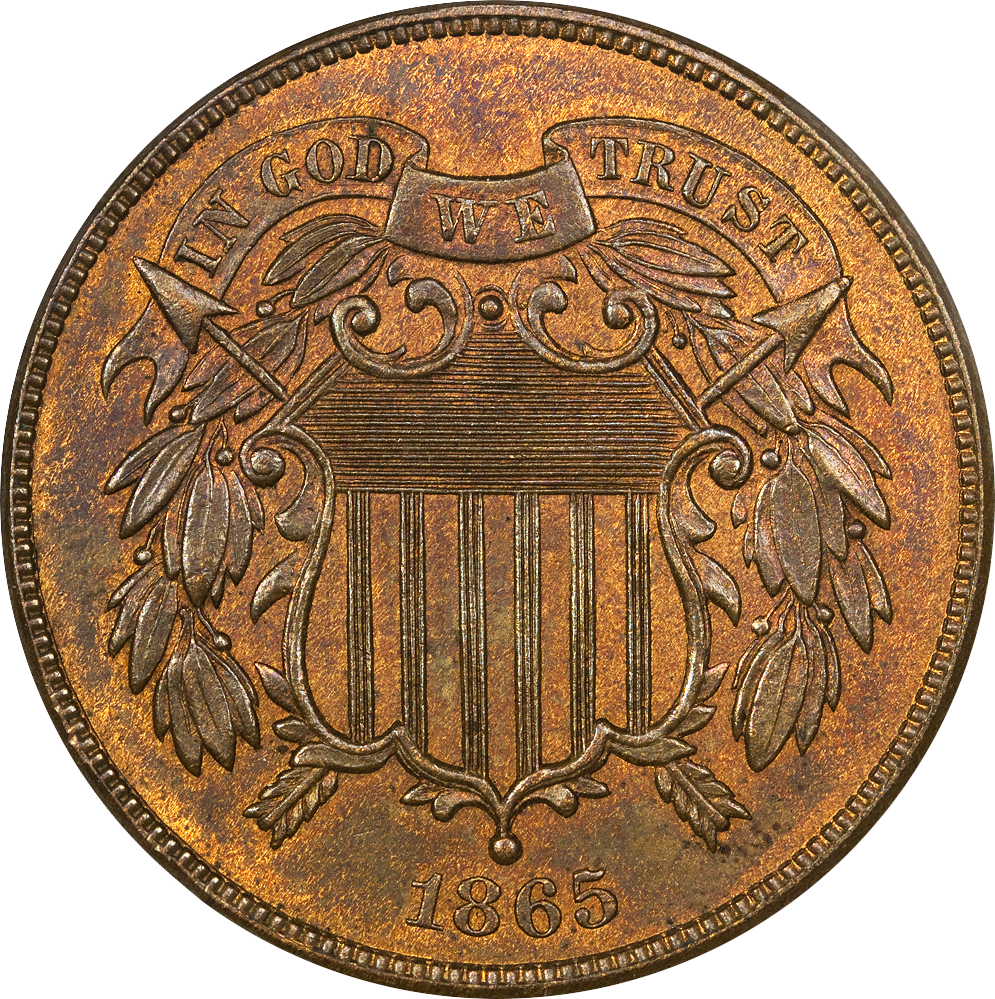
The bronze two-cent piece was issued pursuant to the Act of April 22, 1864.

Since fractional currency in three-cent denominations did not appear until late 1864, the cent was the only means then circulating of making change from the five-cent note, and came, in 1862 and 1863, to command a premium when sold in lots, of about 4%. The Philadelphia Mint tried to keep up with demand, limiting public purchases of cents to five dollars, and sending shipments to major cities. Despite these attempts, Mint Director James Pollock noted in his annual reports that cents were almost unobtainable, hoarded despite the fact that their metallic value remained less than one cent each. Numismatist Neil Carothers theorized that they were put aside by the public as the only circulating federal coinage, made of metal at a time when the public was forced to accept flimsy pieces of paper instead of silver and gold.

With cents from the Philadelphia Mint selling at a premium, many private token issues were issued in 1863, and passed as cents in commerce. Mint officials took notice that the tokens, often made of bronze rather than the copper-nickel alloy then being used in the cent, were not hoarded and began to consider issuing bronze coins. When Pollock proposed legislation for bronze one-, two-, and three-cent pieces, it was opposed by industrialist Joseph Wharton, owner of the major source of nickel in the United States at the time, a mine at Gap, Pennsylvania. Pollock's bill, as introduced, provided for one- and two-cent pieces of bronze, and the Wharton interests opposed it. According to Carothers,

Congress declined to compromise with the nickel interests ... In the House, its opponents managed to delay its passage for a month. Thaddeus Stevens, one of the most influential men in the House, fought it bitterly, admitting, however, that he objected to it because it adversely affected Wharton's interests.

The Coinage Act of 1864 passed into law on April 22 of that year. After entering circulation several months later, the bronze cent and two-cent piece circulated in trade without being hoarded. The bronze alloy was easier to strike than the copper-nickel one, allowing details to be brought forth sharply and extending the life of coinage dies.

== Legislation ==
Nickel, formerly used in the cent, now had no place in American coinage. This was unsatisfactory to Wharton, who sought its return. Although Pollock made no mention of further nickel coinage in his 1864 annual report, Wharton in April of that year published a pamphlet proposing that all non-precious metal coinage be composed of 75% copper and 25% nickel. The copper-nickel cents had contained only 12% nickel, and even so had been difficult for the Mint to strike due to the hardness of the metal, the use of which damaged equipment and quickly broke dies. An alloy of 25% nickel would be even more difficult to coin. Wharton argued that the tough alloy would be difficult to counterfeit.

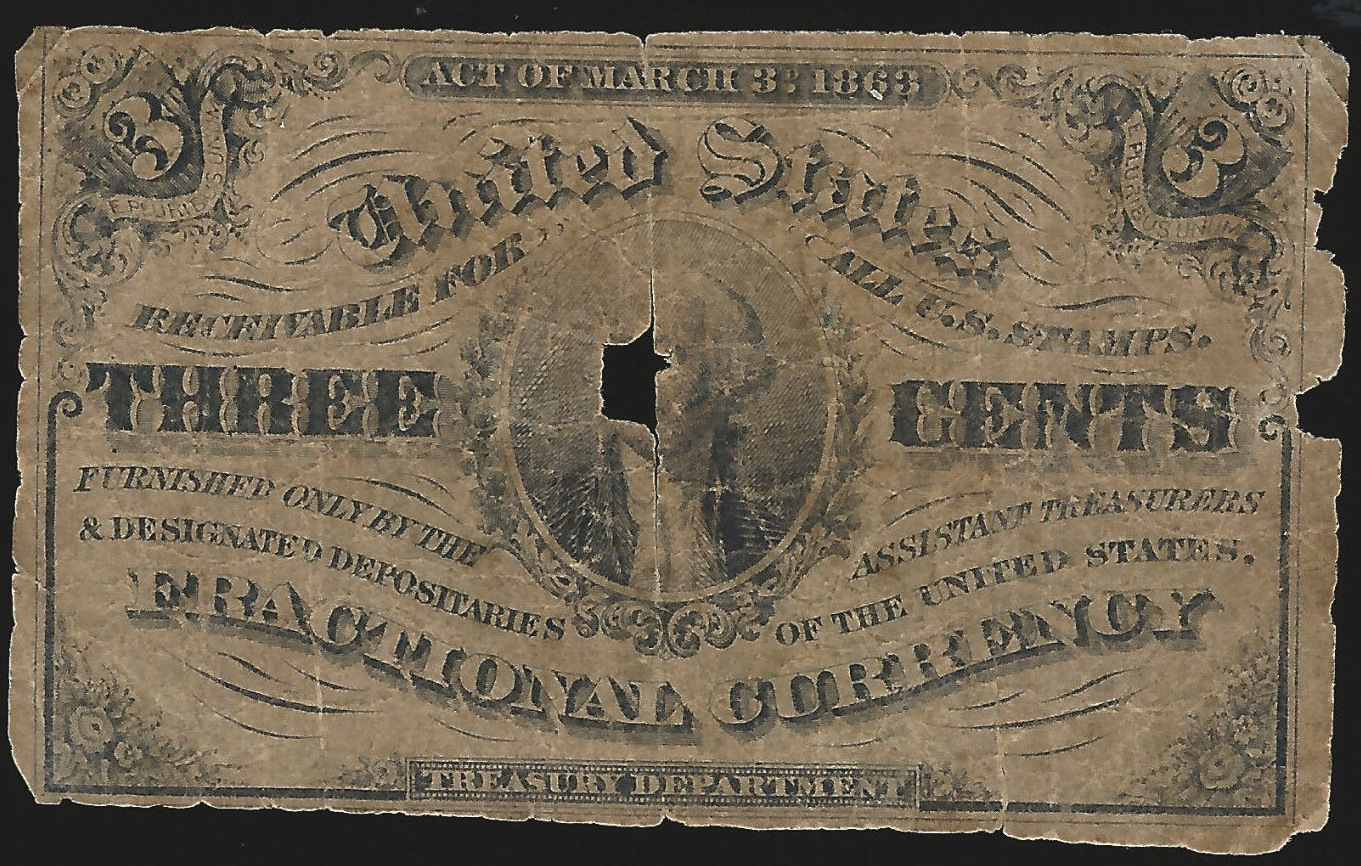
A worn three-cent fractional currency note of 1864

Congress had by the Act of March 3, 1863 authorized fractional currency in the denomination of 3 cents; when these notes reached circulation the following year they proved wildly unpopular. The 1864 law which had substituted bronze for copper-nickel had also outlawed "copperheads" or private token issues. Even though these could now only be issued anonymously, and so could not be redeemed, the copperheads were preferred to the 3-cent shinplasters. Some copperhead tokens even read "Substitute for shinplasters". The notes soon became filthy and ragged, making them even more disliked. They were more difficult to value in quantity than notes with denominations divisible by five. According to Walter Breen, "This was the moment Wharton's supporters had been waiting for." Wharton and his advocates argued that the three-cent notes should be redeemed with equivalent coins. They contended that were Congress to order a three-cent bronze coin, such a piece would be as big as an obsolete large cent, and might be used to deceive the blind into accepting the pre-1857 cent rather than the more valuable coin. Pollock, previously an opponent of nickel coinage, had a change of heart and became a supporter.

There are several slightly varying accounts of why the bill for the three-cent nickel passed. Breen told of the pressure advocates for nickel put on House Coinage Committee chairman John Adam Kasson, finally winning him over to the position that even 25% nickel coins (which would be hard on the Mint's equipment) would be better than the continued use of shinplasters, and presenting him with a draft of a bill for a three-cent piece of that alloy. The bill made the new coin legal tender to sixty cents. The 1864 act had made the cent legal tender to ten cents, and the two-cent piece to twenty; both limits were reduced to four cents. The bill did not abolish the three-cent silver piece, which was still being struck in small quantities. The new copper-nickel coins would be issued in exchange for three-cent shinplasters—the Currency Bureau was instructed to print no more three-cent notes.

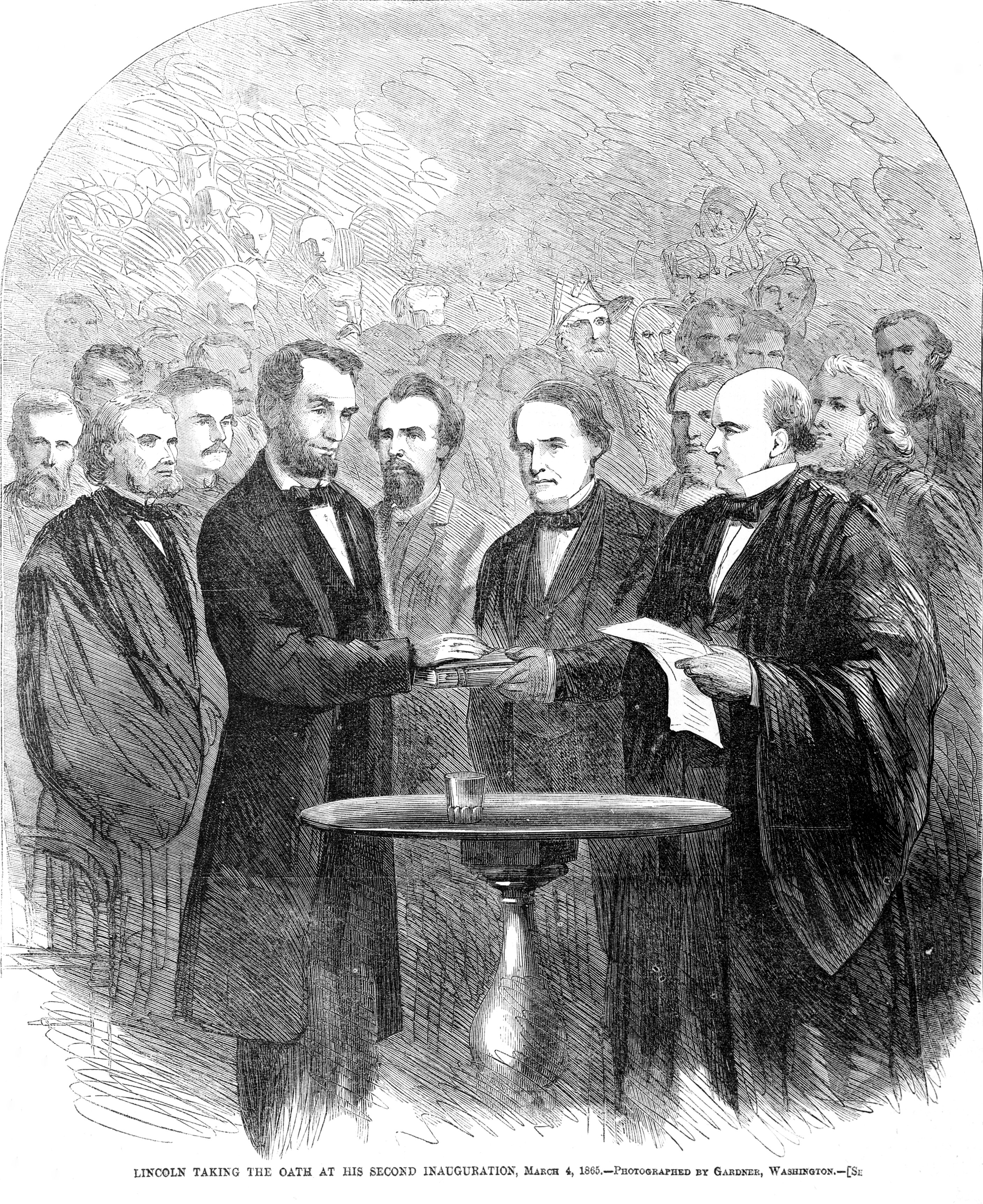
Abraham Lincoln was sworn in for a second term as president only minutes after signing the bill authorizing the three-cent nickel.

The bill passed the House of Representatives on the evening of March 3, 1865. At the time, it was usual to extend the final day of the congressional session in odd-numbered years to noon on March 4, and this occurred. The Senate took up the bill late on the morning of March 4. Action was repeatedly interrupted, first by Ohio Senator John Sherman reporting progress on an appropriations bill, then by Iowa's James Grimes stating that ticket holders for the inaugural festivities at noon were being soaked by rain outside the Capitol, causing some debate as to whether they should be admitted early. Once female guests were admitted (males were left outside), the Senate passed the three-cent nickel bill without debate, and it was shortly thereafter signed by President Abraham Lincoln. (Note: As the signing was before noon, when the congressional session (and the extended legislative day that had begun over 24 hours before) ended, the law is referred to as the Act of March 3, 1865. See Greenbaum, p. 25.)

Q. David Bowers said of the sudden passage of the legislation "We can only guess what happened behind the scenes". Carothers wrote that Kasson had opposed nickel coinage, but nevertheless introduced the bill for it during the rush of the final day of the congressional session, "There was no report and no explanation ... The influences that brought about the passage of the measure in this fashion were never revealed." Numismatic historian Don Taxay suggested that by March 3, 1865, "the wide circulation of the bronze cent and two-cent piece had made a three-cent coin superfluous."

== Design ==
Mint Chief Engraver James B. Longacre had, since 1849, designed coins with various visages of the goddess Liberty, based on a bust, Venus Accroupie, he had seen in a Philadelphia museum on loan from the Vatican. Although the Liberty as used on the three-cent nickel piece is closest to Longacre's experimental cents of 1857 and quarter eagles of 1860, she resembles most of the Chief Engraver's other depictions of Liberty. On the three-cent piece, she wears a coronet with her name on it, and a ribbon binds her hair. For the reverse, Longacre combined the Roman numeral III as rendered on the silver three-cent piece with the laurel wreath used on the 1859 Indian Head cent reverse. Breen suggested that the similarity of design to other Longacre coins has contributed to the low level of collector interest in the three-cent nickel.

According to Lange, "resourceful as always, J.B. Longacre simply revised an existing image of Liberty for the obverse of the nickel three-cent piece. The same classical profile that appears on the Indian Head cent, the gold dollar, and the $3 piece is seen fitted with a new hairstyle and a studded coronet inscribed Liberty." The act that authorized the three-cent nickel contained a provision requiring the use of the motto "In God We Trust" on all pieces large enough to bear it, but the new coin was deemed too small. No change was made to the design of the three-cent piece in nickel during its lifetime.

== Production ==
=== Early years (1865–73) ===
The three-cent nickel piece was very popular when it entered circulation in mid-1865. More convenient than the larger two-cent bronze piece, it largely replaced that coin, starting the two-cent on its way to decreased popularity and abolition in 1873. The hard alloy, though, caused high levels of die breakage. Between 1865 and 1876, some 17 million three-cent pieces were used by the government to redeem the three-cent fractional currency notes.

The Wharton nickel interests were not satisfied by the issuance of the three-cent piece, and soon began to agitate for the passage of a five-cent coin, to be made of the same alloy as the three-cent piece. The Act of May 16, 1866 introduced the five-cent nickel piece, or "nickel", as it has come to be known. (Note: A "nickel" or "nick", was slang that originally referred to the copper-nickel cent piece struck from 1857 to 1864, then briefly to the three-cent nickel piece. It has long been the popular term for the copper-nickel five-cent piece first struck in 1866.) According to David Lange in his history of the Mint, the five-cent piece has "become one of the mainstays of the country's coinage". The new five-cent coin was legal tender up to a dollar.

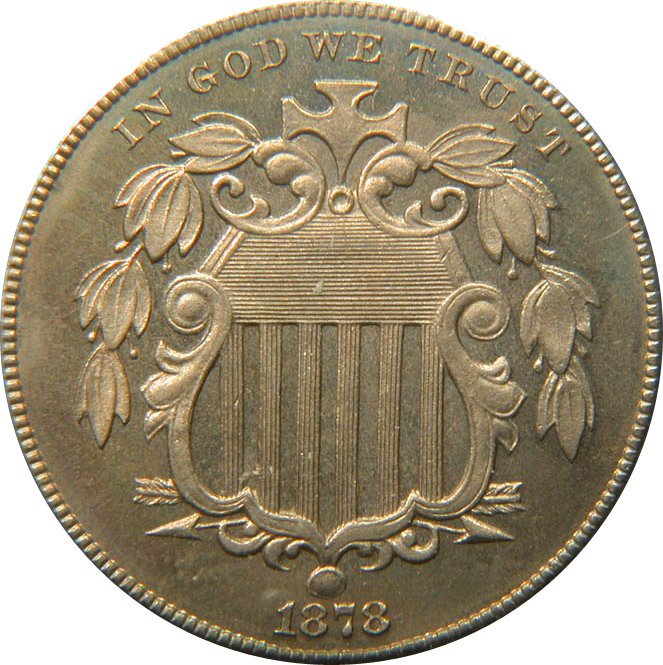
The new Shield nickel (first coined 1866) helped drive the three-cent copper-nickel piece from circulation.

The introduction of the five-cent copper-nickel piece greatly decreased the popularity and use of the three-cent piece. The three-cent piece had debuted in 1865 with a mintage of over eleven million and nearly five million in 1866; thereafter strikings declined, falling to under a million by 1871, a figure the coin would thereafter exceed only twice. The public had preferred small bronze coins to paper money, then the three-cent nickel piece rather than the bronze; they now preferred the five-cent nickel to the three. One reason for this was that the base metal five-cent piece would be redeemed by the government if presented in $100 lots pursuant to a provision in the authorizing legislation. There was no such provision for the three-cent nickel piece; neither was there any for the other base metal coins. Following Pollock's resignation in 1866 over his objections to President Johnson's Reconstruction policies, the new Mint Director was Henry Linderman, who in his first annual report in 1867, described the redemption clause in the nickel's authorizing legislation as "a most wise and just provision", urging its extension to the cent, two-cent piece, and three-cent piece. Postmasters were compelled to take three-cent nickel pieces in exchange for stamps, but had difficulty in depositing them in the Treasury in payment of their obligations, as the government would take no more than sixty cents worth of them in a single transaction. Private individuals and firms similarly refused them beyond the legal tender limit; those with a surplus of base metal coins often sold them at a discount.

Congress took no action on a redemption bill, and in 1868 Linderman wrote again in his annual report, urging that the public be allowed to redeem small-denomination coins, as commerce was flooded with them. He disclosed that he had been redeeming the old copper-nickel cents with three-cent pieces and nickels. Carothers pointed out that exchanging the copper-nickel pieces for cents violated the 1865 and 1866 acts, that stated the three-cent piece and nickel could not be purchased with cents, but only for greenbacks or specie. Linderman strongly advocated a redemption law to relieve the glut of small coins:

But the government that sold these tokens at par for their face value, or paid them as money to its creditors, now turns round and refuses to receive them back in payment from its own officers ... Was there ever an act of the government of a respectable people that, for meanness, can compare with this? An individual that practiced such a confidence game would be branded as a two-penny thief, and would soon be consigned to a house of correction. A government that practices such frauds upon the people cannot hope long to receive the respect of anybody.

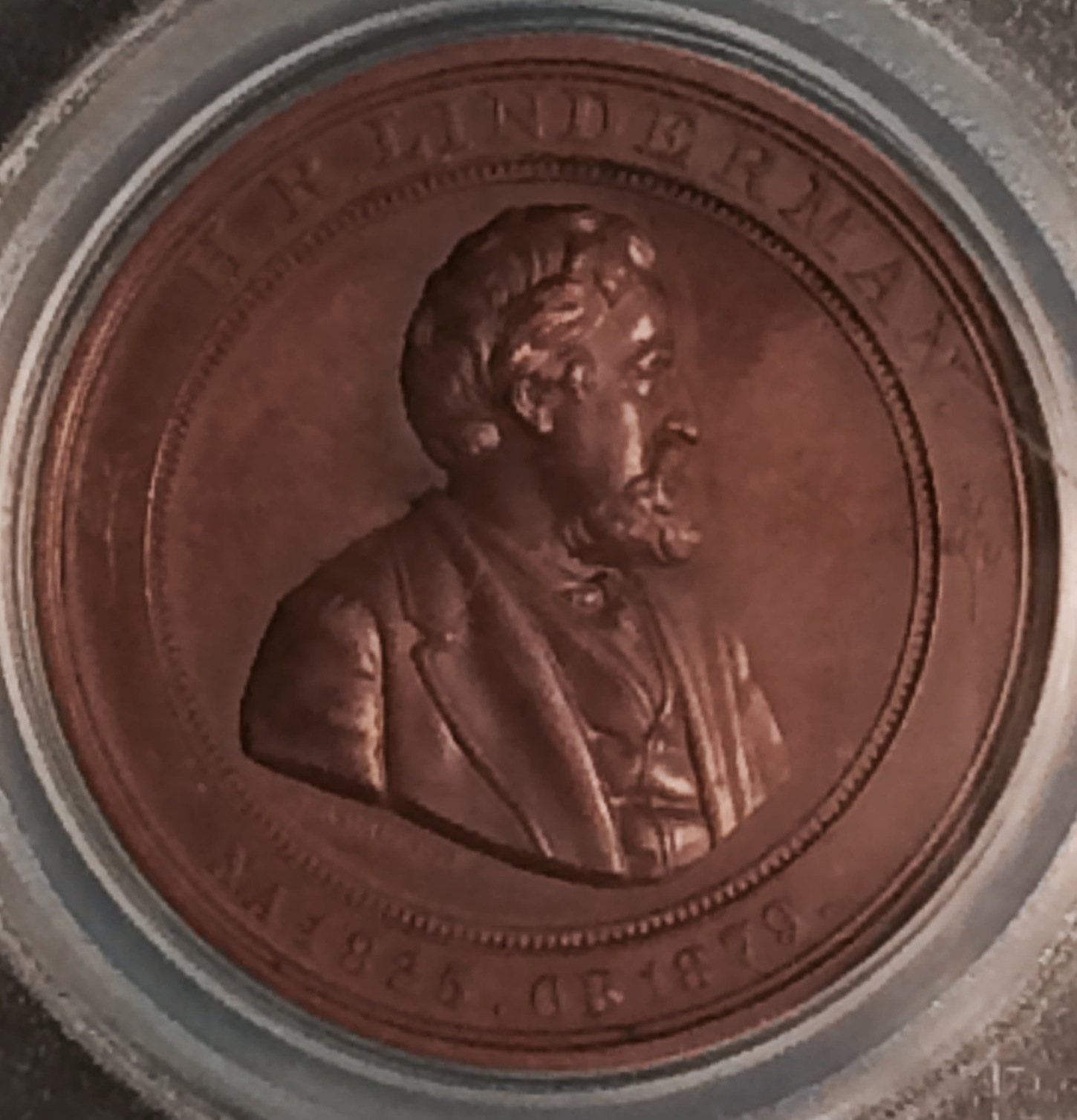
Henry Linderman (seen on the 1879 Assay medal) strongly objected to the government's refusal to redeem the three-cent nickel.

In 1866, Treasury Department official John Jay Knox was sent to examine the San Francisco Mint. After his return to Washington, he submitted a report that recommended many changes to how the Mint did business, including reform of the base-metal coinage. Knox complained that the various enactments for non-specie coinage were "entirely disconnected and incongruous". Linderman submitted legislation to discontinue fractional currency of less than 25 cents, and authorizing copper-nickel coins of one, three and five cents, legal tender and redeemable, and in the case of the three-cent piece, larger and heavier than the existing coin. Linderman's bill was introduced by Pennsylvania Representative William D. Kelley in February 1868. It passed the House in amended form, but was not voted on in the Senate. Kelley tried again in the following term of Congress, and the bill met the same fate as its predecessor.

Pollock returned to office as Mint Director in 1869. Although Pollock opposed redemption, Treasury Secretary George S. Boutwell did not, and a bill allowing for redemption of base-metal coins in lots of at least $20 was signed into law by President Ulysses S. Grant on March 3, 1871. By then, early versions of what became the Coinage Act of 1873 were being considered by Congress. This was a major piece of legislation that reformed the laws relating to the Mint. As introduced by Ohio Senator John Sherman on April 28, 1870, it included Linderman's proposal for the use of copper-nickel in the minor coins. The debate over the bill stretched over the next three years. The use of nickel was a sticking point for the legislation; some congressmen alleged that the whole point of the bill was to benefit Wharton. Between 1870 and 1872, different versions of the bill, with a larger three-cent piece, twice passed the House and once the Senate, but differences between the houses could not be reconciled. After the second House passage, in May 1872, the Senate Finance Committee struck the provisions for copper-nickel coinage. After a conference committee met, both houses passed a version that left the cent, three-cent nickel piece, and nickel unaltered, and it was signed by President Grant on February 12, 1873. The act eliminated the two-cent piece, silver three-cent piece, silver half dime and the standard silver dollar (the last denomination was reinstated in 1878). The three-cent piece was made legal tender to twenty-five cents, as were the other two base-metal coins, the cent and nickel (the surviving silver coins were legal tender to five dollars). Numismatic writer Breen deemed the decision to eliminate the silver three-cent piece and the half dime, which might directly compete with the two copper-nickel coins, a favor to Wharton. Carothers called the abolition of the silver three- and five-cent pieces "a necessity if the 3 cent and 5 cent nickel pieces were to be continued after the revival of silver coinage".

=== Decline and end (1873–90) ===
Varieties of the 1873 three-cent nickel

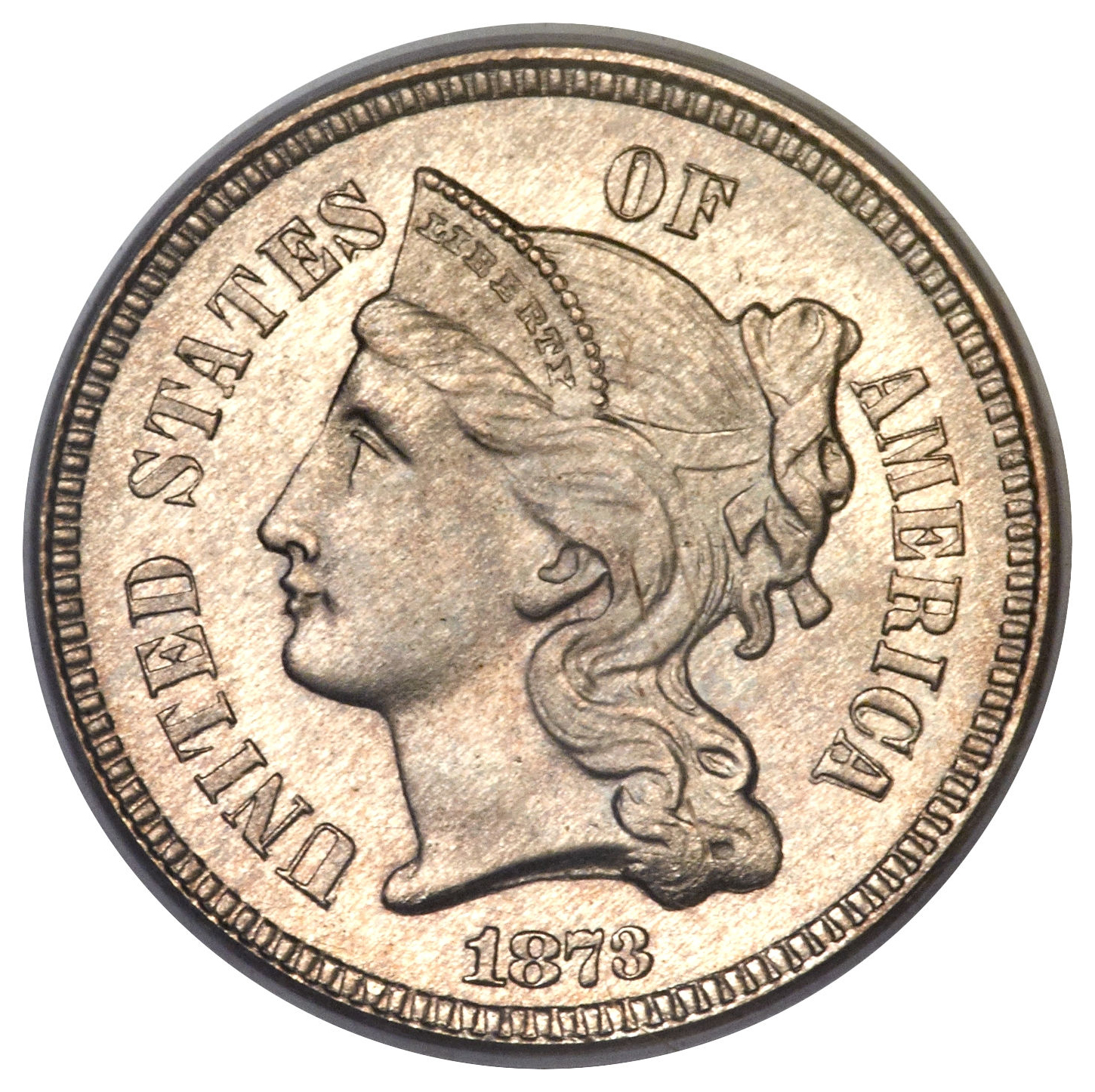
Closed 3

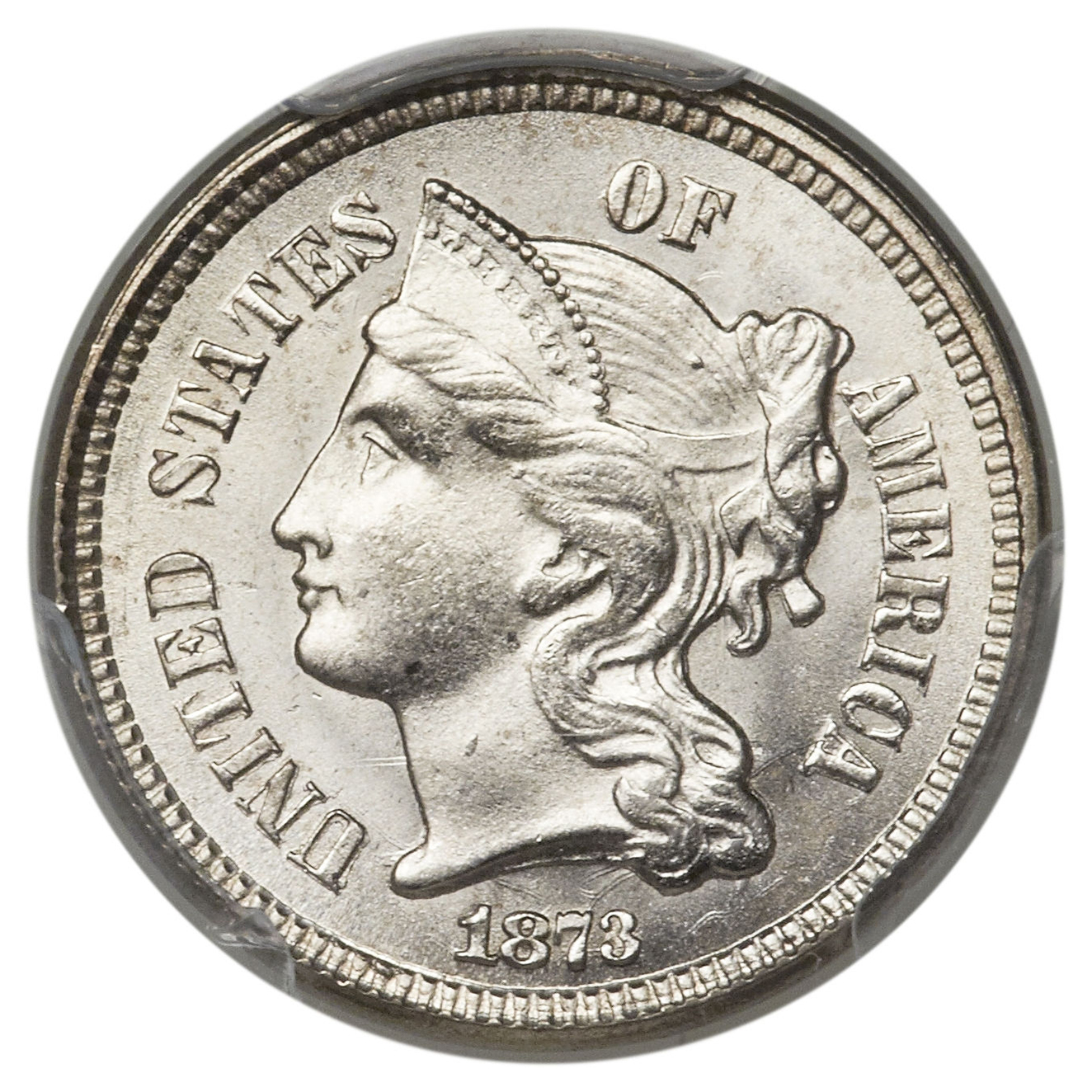
Open 3

On January 18, 1873, Philadelphia Mint Chief Coiner A. Loudon Snowden formally complained to Pollock that on the new year's coins, the digit "3" too closely resembled an "8". Pollock ordered Chief Engraver William Barber (Longacre had died in office on January 1, 1869) to redo the logotypes for the date. Thus, most denominations of American coinage dated 1873, including the three-cent nickel piece, have varieties: the Close (or Closed) 3 from early in the year, and the Open 3 from after Barber made his modifications. A total of 390,000 Closed 3 and 783,000 Open 3 of the three-cent nickel were minted.

Numismatist Bruce C. Goldstein indicated that several factors combined to keep the nickel three-cent piece in decline after the passage of the 1873 act. Less and less fractional currency was being redeemed, as almost a decade had passed since the issuance of three-cent notes. Rich silver strikes in the West lowered the price of that metal to the point where old silver coins emerged from hoarding and circulated again. These factors, combined with ample stocks of cents and nickels, made the three-cent nickel, a non-silver coin of odd denomination, less desirable. By 1876, the mintage for circulation had declined to 162,000. None were struck for circulation in 1877 and 1878, though some proof coins were minted for sale to the public.

Although more than a million were minted in 1881, another blow to the three-cent piece occurred on October 1, 1883, when first-class mail rates were lowered from three to two cents for the first 0.5 ounces (14 g). Although the rate for pieces weighing up to 1 ounce (28 g) initially remained at three cents, the two-cent rate was extended to one ounce effective July 1, 1885. Deprived of the original reason for the denomination's existence, no three-cent pieces were struck for circulation in 1886 (though several thousand proof coins were produced), and in the three remaining years of the piece's life, a total of less than 60,000 circulation strikes were minted. As the production of three-cent pieces dwindled, the other non-specie coins prospered, with record numbers of cents being struck in the 1880s to address the need to make change, and for penny arcade machines. The nickel proved popular in slot machines and street railways, which often set fares at five cents. With silver again circulating, the three-cent piece became more unpopular because it was almost the same diameter as the dime, leading to confusion and small frauds.

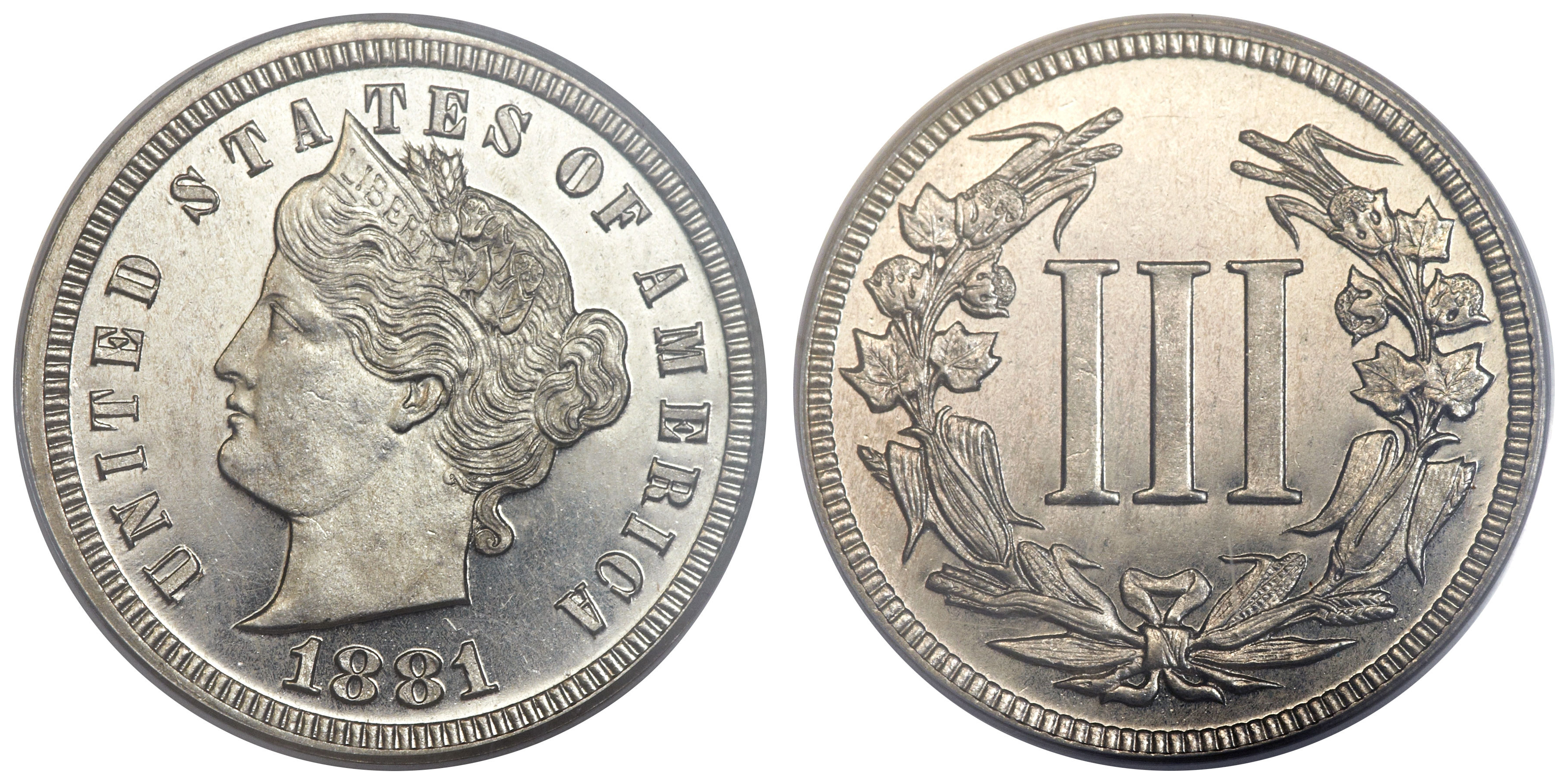
1881 pattern by Chief Engraver Charles E. Barber for the three-cent nickel. The design was used on the Liberty Head nickel.

Beginning in 1880, in their annual reports, the Mint Director and Treasury Secretary appealed to Congress to discontinue the three-cent piece. The last three-cent pieces were struck in 1889, and the denomination was discontinued, along with the gold dollar and the three-dollar piece, by the Act of September 26, 1890. Many of the coins from 1888 and 1889 were still held at the Treasury Department and were melted after passage of the act, the fate of millions more as they flowed back from banks. The resultant metal contributed to large mintages of the Liberty Head nickel between 1890 and 1893.

One proposal to revive the three-cent piece was made in 1911, when Mayors Brand Whitlock of Toledo, Ohio, and Newton D. Baker of Cleveland sent a joint memorial to Congress urging its return. The following year, a subcommittee of the House Committee on Coinage, Weights and Measures held a hearing on bills to authorize a copper-nickel three-cent piece and to change the composition of the cent to copper-nickel. Mint Director George E. Roberts testified and indicated he had no objection to a three-cent piece, as there was at least limited demand for a coin larger than the cent and smaller than the nickel. In 1936, a bill for a three-cent nickel was among various coin legislation considered by the Senate Banking Committee. In 1942, Congress granted the Treasury Secretary the temporary authority to change the composition of the nickel because of wartime metal shortages, and if public demand for the five-cent piece required it, the Mint could strike three-cent pieces. Nothing came of any of the proposals. The three-cent piece was confirmed as fully legal tender by the Coinage Act of 1965, which proclaimed all coin and currency of the United States good to any amount for payment of public and private debt. By then, that coin had long since passed from the scene.

== Collecting ==
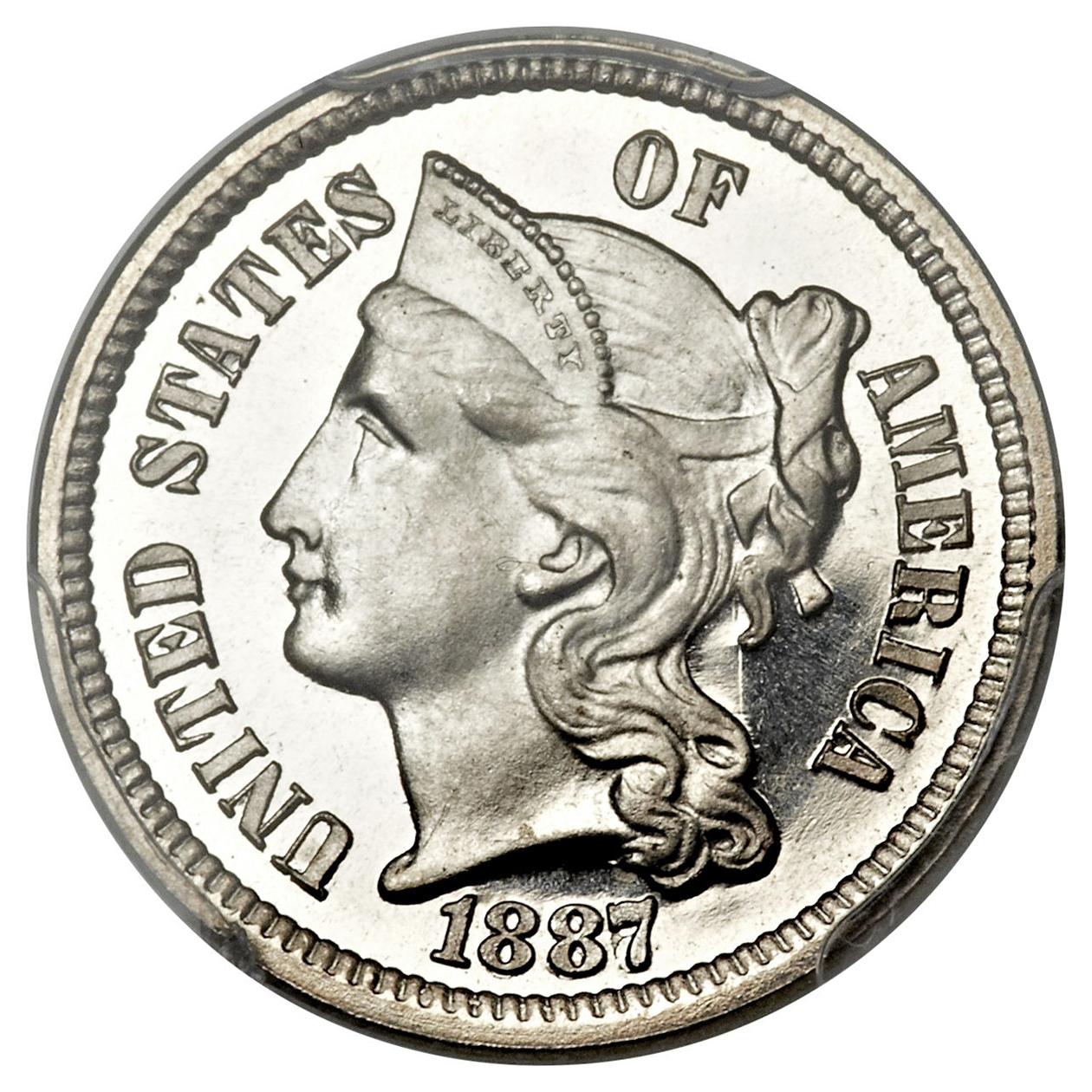
1887/6 three-cent nickel

According to the 2018 edition of R.S. Yeoman's A Guide Book of United States Coins, only the pieces from 1882 to 1887 catalog for more than $100 in worn Good-4 condition; common dates list for $15 to $20 in that condition. The highest value listed is for the 1877, struck only in proof with a mintage of 900, at $2,000. David F. Fanning, in his 2001 article on the three-cent pieces, suggested that rarer specimens of the nickel three-cent piece are relatively inexpensive compared with coins of similar mintage in more popular series, such as the Morgan dollar.

The design of the three-cent nickel piece remained stable throughout its run, and there are few varieties. An overdate is known, 1887/6. The die that struck those coins was originally dated 1886, when no circulation strikes were made. So the die would not be wasted, the Mint altered the last digit from a 6 to a 7; evidence of both numbers is visible. Some 1865 pieces in proof condition display a wreath on the reverse that comes much closer to touching the rim than on later issues. These were most likely pattern coins but they are accepted as issued because the Mint placed them in some 1865 proof sets. Many of the three-cent nickel pieces were not fully struck, and are missing details of the design; this is because the head of Liberty is directly opposite the III, and the Mint had trouble getting the hard metal alloy to adequately flow to the high points of both sides.

== Notes and references ==
Notes

Citations

Bibliography

- Bowers, Q. David (2006). A Guide Book of Shield and Liberty Head Nickels. Atlanta, GA: Whitman Publishing. ISBN 978-0-7948-1921-7.
- Breen, Walter (1988). Walter Breen's Complete Encyclopedia of U.S. and Colonial Coins. New York, N.Y.: Doubleday. ISBN 978-0-385-14207-6. OL 4404444M.
- Bureau of the Mint (1904). Laws of the United States Relating to the Coinage. Washington, D.C.: United States Government Printing Office. OCLC 8109299.
- Carothers, Neil (1988) [1930]. Fractional Money: A History of Small Coins and Fractional Paper Currency of the United States. New York: John Wiley & Sons, Inc. (reprinted 1988 by Bowers and Merena Galleries, Inc., Wolfeboro, NH). ISBN 0-943161-12-6.
- House Committee on Coinage, Weights, and Measures (1912). Coinage of a Three-Cent Piece. Washington, D.C.: United States Government Printing Office. OCLC 576522762.
- Lange, David W. (2006). History of the United States Mint and its Coinage. Atlanta, GA: Whitman Publishing. ISBN 978-0-7948-1972-9.
- Senate Committee on Banking and Currency (1936). Bills on Issuance of Commemorative Coins. Washington, D.C.: United States Government Printing Office.
- Taxay, Don (1983). The U.S. Mint and Coinage (reprint of 1966 ed.). New York: Sanford J. Durst Numismatic Publications. ISBN 978-0-915262-68-7.
- Yeoman, R.S. (2017). Bressett, Kenneth (ed.). A Guide Book of United States Coins 2018 (71th ed.). Atlanta, Georgia: Whitman Publishing. ISBN 978-0794845032.

Other sources

- Fanning, David F. (January 2001). "Silver and Nickel 3-Cent Pieces: An Overview". The Numismatist. Colorado Springs, CO: American Numismatic Association: 36–38, 97–98.
- Goldstein, Bruce C. (June 6, 2011). "The Power of 3s". Coin World. Sidney, OH: Amos Press, Inc.: 4–5, 14–15, 18.
- Greenbaum, Gary M. (November 2015). "A Share of Glory". The Numismatist. Colorado Springs, CO: American Numismatic Association: 25.
- "Chile asks Longacre for dies in 1866". Iola, Wisc.: Krause Publications. Archived from the original on March 8, 2014.
