= Three-cent bronze =

American coin

- United States
- Value: 3 cents (0.03 US dollars)
- Diameter: 28.57 mm
- Edge: Plain
- Composition: 95% copper; 5% tin and zinc
- Years of minting: 1863
- Catalog number: Judd-319, Pollock 384

Obverse
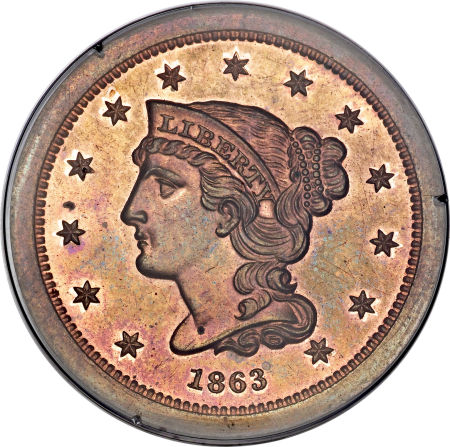
- Design: Liberty with braided hair
- Designer: Christian Gobrecht
- Design date: 1863

Reverse
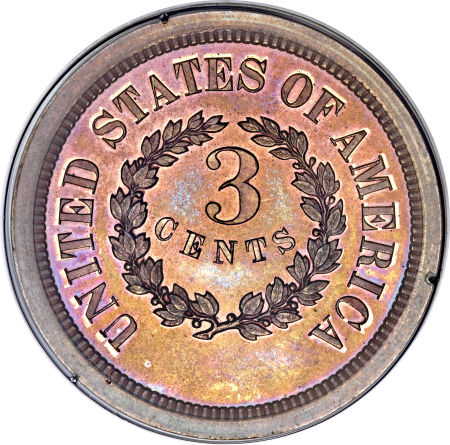
- Design: Denomination surrounded by a wreath
- Design date: 1863

The three-cent bronze was a pattern coin struck in 1863 by George Eckfeldt. The coin shares its obverse design (other than the font of the date, which is smaller and curved), thickness, and diameter with that of the Braided Hair large cent, but was made of bronze rather than pure copper. Weighing 140 grains, it weighed nearly three times that of the bronze Indian Head cent. About 50 to 60 examples are known.

The obverse features an image of Liberty.

== History ==
Throughout 1863, the coins were struck on planchets of varying thickness. According to Eckfeldt's journal:

Struck a few 3 cent pieces of copper & zinc; the size, thickness and diameter about that of the 1857 copper cent. About the middle of 1863.

== Other versions ==
An aluminum version (Judd-320, Pollock-385) was made using a very similar design. However, examples are extremely rare with only 5 confirmed.

== See also ==
- Three-cent nickel
- Three-cent silver
