= A Tale of Two Nations =

1894 novel by William Hope "Coin" Harvey

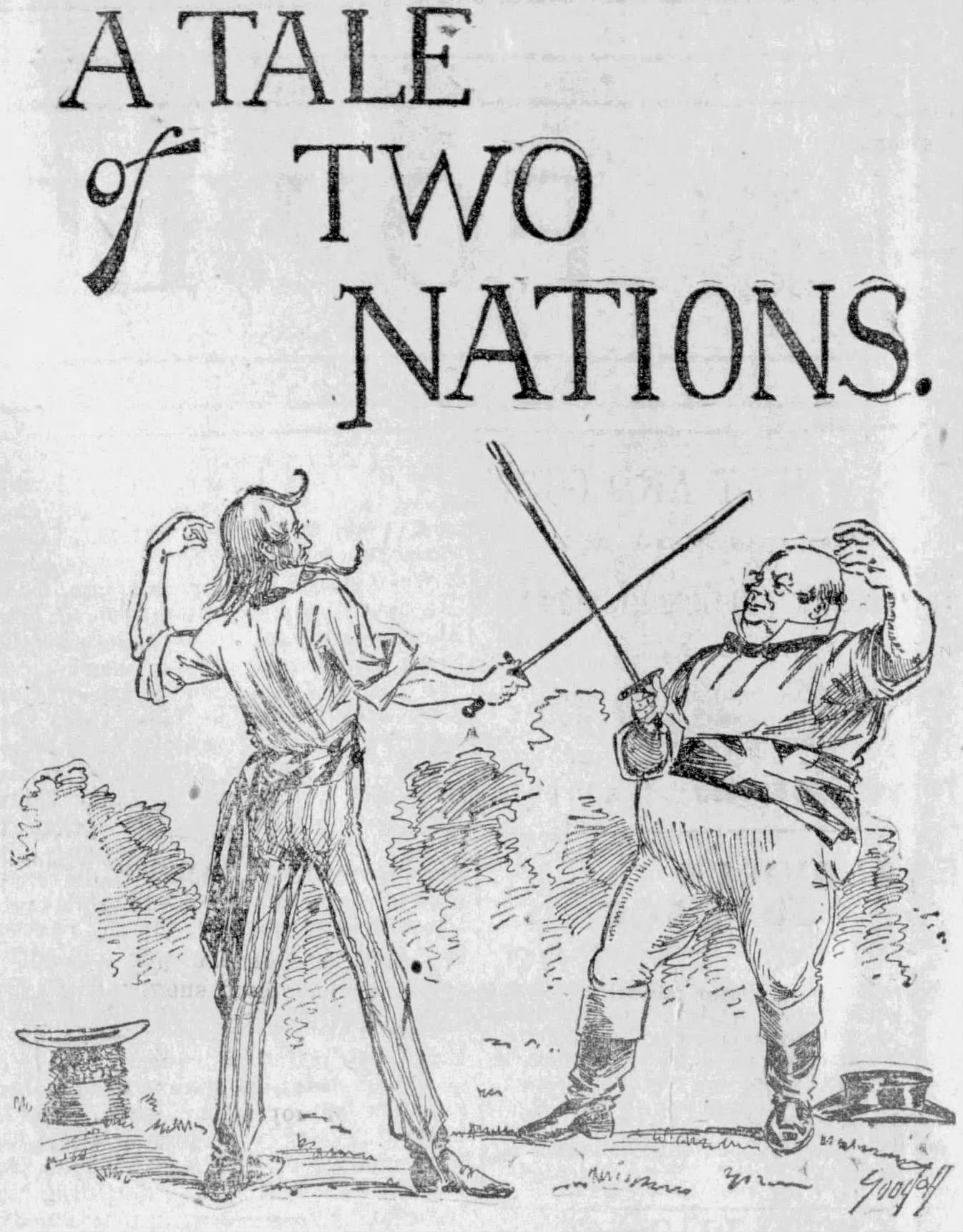
- Cover illustration of Uncle Sam dueling John Bull
- Author: William Hope "Coin" Harvey
- Language: English
- Genre: Roman à clef
- Publisher: Coin Publishing Company
- Publication date: September 1894
- Pages: 302
- Preceded by: Coin's Financial School

A Tale of Two Nations is an 1894 novel by American free silver activist William Hope "Coin" Harvey. It is a roman à clef of Silverite conspiracy theories surrounding the Coinage Act of 1873 and the gold standard. The novel's hero is an idealized William Jennings Bryan. Harvey wrote the novel at about the same time as he wrote the pamphlet Coin's Financial School. A Tale of Two Nations was Harvey's second-most successful work, after Coin's Financial School, and he had it reprinted many times. Its second edition sold at least one hundred thousand copies and it probably sold several hundred thousand copies overall. Harvey's writings were an instrumental part of the bimetallist movement which propelled Bryan to become the Democratic Party's nominee in the 1896 presidential election. A Tale of Two Nations is intensely Anglophobic and there is debate over the extent to which it is antisemitic.

== Background ==
The Coinage Act of 1792 established the U.S. dollar as a bimetallic currency, based on the value of silver and gold. By 1869, political and economic developments had resulted in silver leaving circulation and this reality was formalized with the Coinage Act of 1873, which demonetized silver and de facto established a gold standard. This was uncontroversial and went relatively unnoticed. Economic and political developments soon caused the remonetization of silver to become the central political cause for supporters of inflation. Known as Silverites, they were populists and agrarians ideologically hostile to bankers, especially Wall Street, foreigners, Britain in particular, and the British-Jewish Rothschild banking family most particularly. Most Silverites imagined that the demonetization of silver had been accomplished through trickery and deception by some combination of those groups, calling it the "Crime of '73".

In May 1893, William Hope Harvey moved to Chicago and established Coin Publishing Company, which was dedicated to promoting the free silver cause. He was an amateur economist who had worked as a silver mine superintendent in his early life. In June 1894, Harvey published the illustrated pamphlet Coin's Financial School. The pamphlet follows the fictitious boy "Coin" as he lectures about the deficiencies of the gold standard, defeating many of the nation's leading pro-gold intellectuals. It was the most successful and popular bimetallist writing, gaining its author the nickname "Coin" Harvey and reaching a circulation then-rarely seen by singular works, with estimates of its sales ranging from 650,000 to 1,500,000. While writing a biography of Harvey, historian Richard Hofstadter evaluated it as his only work that had well-developed arguments or a façade of coherence.

== Plot ==
In 1869, British Jewish banker Baron Rothe hatches a scheme to demonetize silver in the United States and Europe. If successful, this would increase the wealth of gold owners, ensure British supremacy over the U.S., and stratify society into the rich and the poor. He bribes money-hungry U.S. Senator John Arnold to help, and the senator agrees even though it is against the interests of the U.S. and unsound economic policy. Victor Rogasner, the Baron's indulgent nephew who seeks vengeance for the American Revolution, comes to the U.S. in 1872 to aid his uncle's plans. Through the corruption prevalent during the Grant administration, he is victorious and silver is covertly demonetized, the Crime of '73. Rogasner succeeds in demonetizing silver in Germany (Note: Harvey incorrectly dated the demonetization of silver in the German Empire in both Coin's Financial School and A Tale of Two Nations. It occurred in 1871, before demonetization in the United States.) and France before returning to the U.S. in 1876 to defend the gold standard, as the Crime of '73 has been discovered. He assumes the identity of an American investment banker.

In 1894, with the U.S. shaken by the demonetization of silver, the Panic of 1893, the Pullman Strike, and Coxey's Army marching on Washington, D.C., the wealthy Rogasner waits for the destruction of the U.S., which he says will culminate in either anarchy or monarchy. Rogasner is well-aware of the deficiencies of the gold standard and usury, able to recognize them because he is a Jew, but he nonetheless supports the gold standard and inequality because he is evil. He has also become enamored with Grace Vivian, Arnold's beautiful ward. Grace does not love Rogasner and instead loves John Melwyn, a well-spoken and pro-silver Nebraska congressman. Melwyn is disadvantaged in seeking Grace's affections and Arnold sabotages his attempts, with Rogasner covertly working to bankrupt him. Rogasner courts Grace and proposes to her, but she declines, causing him to reveal his wealth and true origin in the hope that she is a gold digger and will change her mind, but she is offended and again declines.

Rogasner comes to Arnold and demands that he force Grace to accept his proposal, but Arnold will not force Grace to marry a man she does not want to. Rogasner blackmails Arnold, and he succumbs and agrees to force Grace to marry him, but Grace overhears the blackmail and confronts Rogasner, rejecting him and the greed he inherited through inbreeding. Rogasner approaches Grace, with unknown intent, before Melwyn breaks into the room and tackles him. Rogasner is defeated, leaves the U.S., and becomes stricken by paralysis. Grace leaves Arnold's wardship and marries Melwyn, moving to his home in Lincoln, Nebraska. Rogasner's masters dispatch another foreigner to resume defense of the gold standard.

== Characters ==
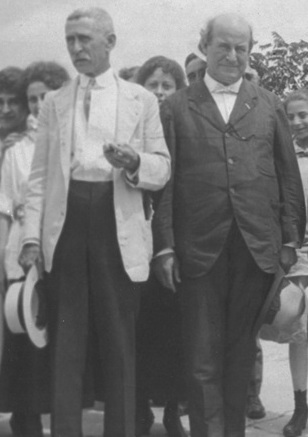
Harvey and Bryan, c. 1910s

A Tale of Two Nations is a roman à clef, a type of novel where real events are overlaid with a façade of fiction. The political characters in the novel correspond to real people:

- Baron Rothe is a Baron Rothschild.
- John Arnold is probably named for John Sherman, a pro-gold politician, and Benedict Arnold, a famed traitor. Sherman was particularly hated by Silverites.
- Victor Rogasner has been put forward as being based on various people. Hofstadter identified Rogasner as probably being Ernest Seyd, a German- and Jewish-born British banker who supported bimetallism but was the subject of widespread hoaxes which alleged he was involved in the Crime of '73. Political scientist Benjamin Ginsberg guessed that Rogasner was based on August Belmont, a German- and Jewish-born American banker connected to the Rothschilds and a longtime chair of the Democratic National Committee. Historian Robin Gollan identified Rogasner as being a caricature of a British and Jewish banker.
- John Melwyn is William Jennings Bryan, a congressman from Lincoln, Nebraska, who supported bimetallism and was famed for his oratory prowess. The novel's publisher confirmed that Melwyn was based on Bryan after he became the Democratic Party's nominee in the 1896 presidential election.

== Analysis and reception ==
Author Nathaniel Weyl called the novel "naive and untalented". Author and poet John Gould Fletcher called it unusual and unreadable. Hofstadter called the novel propagandistic, its plot melodramatic, and noted his amusement at the concept of a roman à clef about the gold standard. Historian William Charles Reuter described the novel as combining a "conventional melodramatic love story" and Silverite campaigning. Historian Allen Weinstein said that the only accurate statement in the novel's recounting of the Crime of '73 was the lack of immediate reaction to it. In contrast, academic L. J. Rather said that its recounting probably had some factual basis.

=== Antisemitism and Anglophobia ===
Analysis of A Tale of Two Nations often occurs as part of an academic debate surrounding the populist movement's relationship with antisemitism, with historian Oscar Handlin and Hofstadter both arguing that the populist movement bore responsibility for the emergence of virulent antisemitism in the United States. Handlin briefly cited A Tale of Two Nations in his argument. Responding to Handlin and disagreeing with his claims about the populist movement, historian Norman Pollack argued that the novel was not antisemitic but only Anglophobic, arguing that it portrays some Jews favorably, has only two brief instances of antisemitic commentary, primarily identifies its British-Jewish villains as British, omits standard antisemitic tropes, stresses that its villainous Jews are not representative of Jewry, and has conflict between Britain and the U.S as its central theme. Weyl noted with interest that the novel's villains were not part of an international Jewish conspiracy but instead a British conspiracy. Rather placed Baron Rothe as being intellectually descended from Sidonia, an international Jew from Benjamin Disraeli's Coningsby, identified Rogasner as being an assimilationist Jew, and speculated that Baron Rothe and Rogasner could be based on leaks of Cecil Rhodes's plan for a secret society to advance British interests.

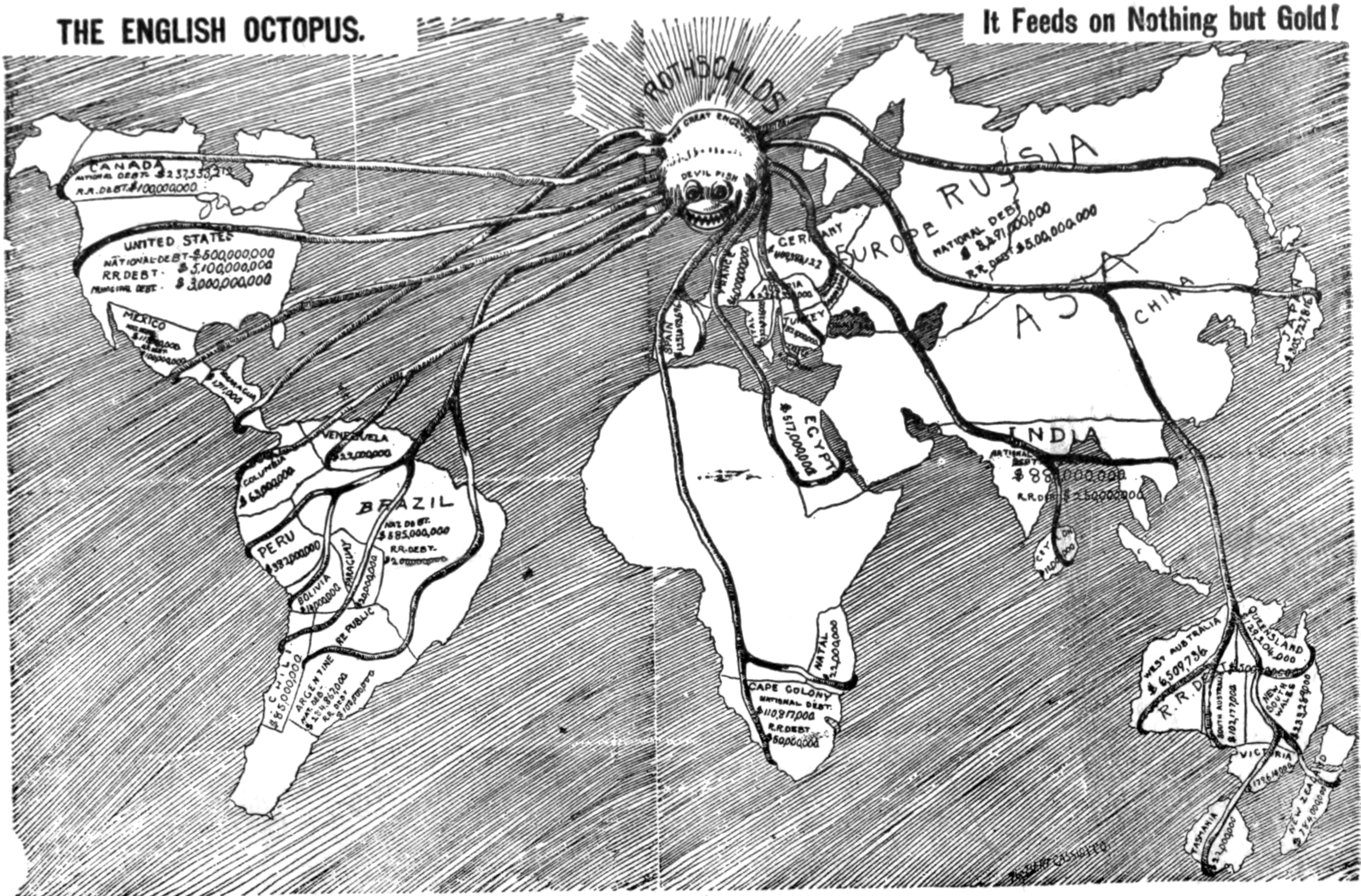
Illustration in Coin's Financial School

Hofstadter argued that A Tale of Two Nations showed the same significance as Ignatius L. Donnelly's novel Caesar's Column "as a fantasy that illuminates the populist mind", although Weyl argued that Caesar's Column was much more significant. The novel is seen as expanding on the ideas Harvey expressed in Coin's Financial School, particularly its Anglophobia, but the pamphlet did not include much antisemitism. The pamphlet included statements on the popularity of war with the United Kingdom, an illustration of an octopus emerging from the United Kingdom named "Rothschild" enwrapping the world, and some editions had an illustration of a personified United Kingdom strangling prosperity personified while an imprisoned personification of silver watched. Hofstader argued that A Tale of Two Nations is mildly antisemitic, saying that was only a facet of the Anglophobic sentiment of the populist movement. He said that it is only mildly antisemitic as its attacks on Jews are verbal and do not extend to calls for any systematic programs.

Author Louis Harap identified the titular "two nations" as referring to both the United Kingdom and United States, and the rich who support the gold standard and the rest who are oppressed by it. Harap, while otherwise crediting Pollack with refuting Handlin and Hofstadter's ideas on antisemitism in the populist movement, disagreed with his defense of A Tale of Two Nations. Harap argued that Baron Rothe recalls antisemitic stereotypes, even if he does not wholly fit them, that Rogasner was wholly created by antisemitism, and that while the central conflict is between Britain and the U.S., the only agents of British interest are Jews. Harap concluded that the novel utilizes antisemitism, albeit without saying whether Harvey did so consciously. Historian Michael Dobkowski also disagreed with Pollack and charged A Tale of Two Nations with contributing to the emergence of virulent antisemitism. Historian William Charles Reuter wrote that the novel's "heavy-handed" antisemitism was atypical of contemporary pro-silver literature. Harvey eventually realized that A Tale of Two Nations would lead to charges that he was an antisemite and seemed to be ashamed. In his 1895 work Coin's Financial School Up to Date, Harvey responded to the charges with an attempted philosemitic remark that was itself antisemitic. As late as 1920, Harvey was publishing antisemitic remarks. His antisemitic views of Jews as both intelligent and immoral was common.

== Writing and publication history ==
Advertisement in later editions of Coin's Financial School

A Tale of Two Nations [is] the most exciting and interesting novel on American politics ever published. It ruthlessly tears aside the curtain and exposes to the public the blackest epoch in the history of the world.

A Tale of Two Nations was written at about the same time as Coin's Financial School and published three months after in September 1894. The novel is dedicated "to the people of this age – and ages yet to come." It was Harvey's second-most successful work, after Coin's Financial School, and it is sometimes identified as his only other significant work. The novel's 25¢ and 50¢ editions were successful, and Harvey claimed it sold 500,000 copies overall. He had the novel reprinted many times. The second edition sold at least 100,000 copies and the novel probably sold several hundred thousand copies overall. Harvey advertised the novel in and attached its first two chapters to later editions of Coin's Financial School, which increased the novel's sales. The cover of a 1931 reprint reads: "With a sufficient number of copies of this book read by the people of the United States, this civilization will be saved from perishing and in a reasonable time there will be a perfected civilization." (Note: In his later years, Harvey became convinced that society would collapse if his ideas were not implemented.)

== Impact ==
At the 1896 Democratic National Convention, using language easily understood partly because of the popularity of Harvey's writings, Bryan decried the "cross of gold", electrifying the convention to such an extent that it made him the party's presidential nominee. Harvey actively campaigned on Bryan's behalf and Bryan noted appreciatively Harvey's contribution to the bimetallist movement, most especially Coin's Financial School but also his other writings and activism. Bryan was ultimately defeated by Republican nominee William McKinley. He was renominated and again defeated in 1900 and 1908. Harvey largely retired from politics after Bryan was defeated in 1900, turning his focus to building the health resort Monte Ne. Bryan joined the cabinet of President Woodrow Wilson in 1913 and unsuccessfully lobbied for Harvey to be given a job in the administration. Harvey reprinted part of the novel in The Book, a Great Depression-era text which called for the formation of a new political party; he formed the Liberty Party and was its nominee in the 1932 presidential election.
