= Harvey House (Huntington, West Virginia) =

Historic house in West Virginia, United States

- U.S. National Register of Historic Places
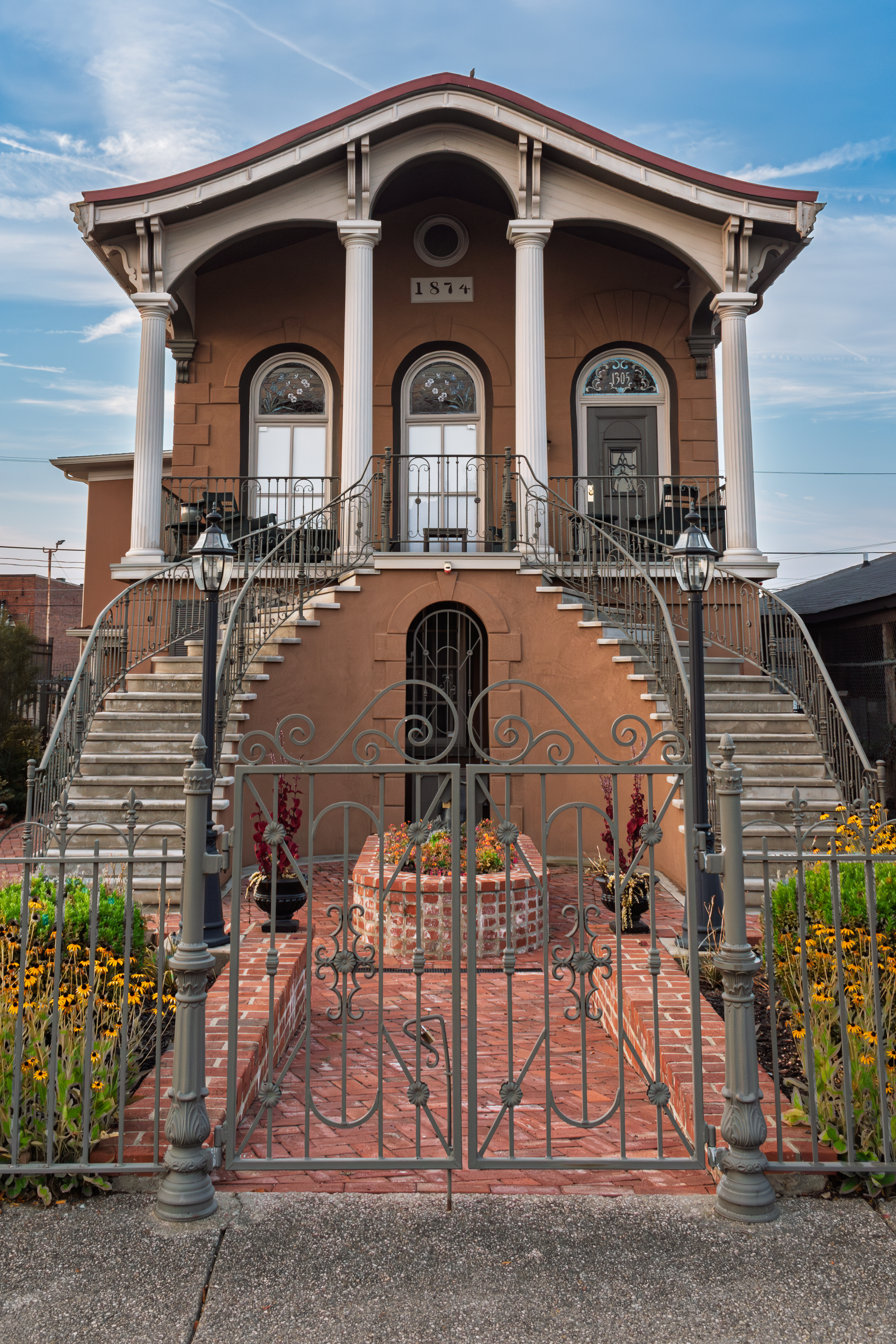
- Coin Harvey House, August 2025

- Location within West Virginia Location within the United States
- Location: 1305 3rd Ave., Huntington, West Virginia
- Coordinates: 38°25′24″N 82°26′15″W
- Area: 0.1 acres (0.040 ha)
- Built: 1874
- Architects: Harvey, William Hope
- NRHP reference No.: 72001285
- Added to NRHP: August 21, 1972

Harvey House, also known as the "Coin" Harvey House, is a historic home located at Huntington, Cabell County, West Virginia. It was built in 1874, and is a two-story dwelling reminiscent of houses in New Orleans. It features stained glass windows, a cast iron mantel, and a beamed ceiling in the dining room. It is most notable as the home of William Hope "Coin" Harvey (1851 – 1936).

It was listed on the National Register of Historic Places in 1973.

== See also ==
- National Register of Historic Places listings in Cabell County, West Virginia
