= William Jennings Bryan 1896 presidential campaign =

American political campaign

William Jennings Bryan for President
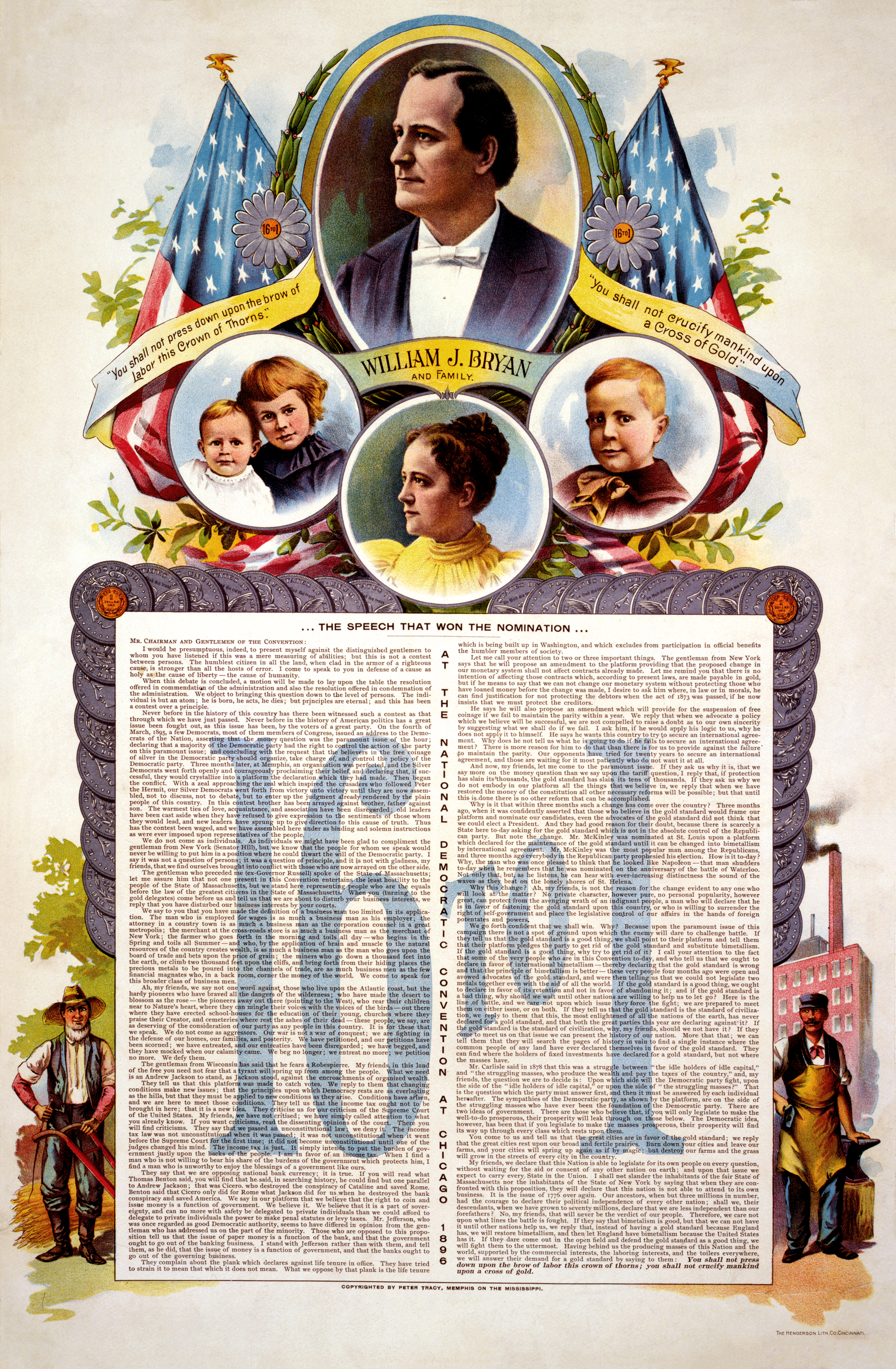
- Campaign: U.S. presidential election, 1896
- Candidate: William Jennings Bryan; U.S. Representative for Nebraska's 1st (1891–1895); Arthur Sewall (Democratic running mate); Director of the Maine Central Railroad; Thomas E. Watson (Populist running mate); U.S. Representative for Georgia's 10th (1891–1893)
- Affiliation: Democratic Party; also endorsed by Populist Party and National Silver Party
- Status: Defeated: November 3, 1896
- Headquarters: Chicago
- Key people: Mary Baird Bryan (wife and assistant); Senator James K. Jones (Democratic National Committee chairman); Josephus Daniels (campaign arrangements manager)
- Receipts: US$500,000 (estimated)

In 1896, William Jennings Bryan ran unsuccessfully for president of the United States. Bryan, a former Democratic congressman from Nebraska, gained his party's presidential nomination in July of that year after electrifying the Democratic National Convention with his Cross of Gold speech. He was defeated in the general election by the Republican candidate, former Ohio governor William McKinley.

Born in 1860, Bryan grew up in rural Illinois and in 1887 moved to Nebraska, where he practiced law and entered politics. He won election to the House of Representatives in 1890, and was re-elected in 1892, before mounting an unsuccessful US Senate run. He set his sights on higher office, believing he could be elected president in 1896 even though he remained a relatively minor figure in the Democratic Party. In anticipation of a presidential campaign, he spent much of 1895 and early 1896 making speeches across the United States; his compelling oratory increased his popularity in his party.

Bryan often spoke on the issue of the currency. The economic Panic of 1893 had left the nation in a deep recession, which still persisted in early 1896. Bryan and many other Democrats believed the economic malaise could be remedied through a return to bimetallism, or free silver—a policy they believed would inflate the currency and make it easier for debtors to repay loans. Bryan went to the Democratic convention in Chicago as an undeclared candidate, whom the press had given only a small chance of becoming the Democratic nominee. His 'Cross of Gold' speech, given to conclude the debate on the party platform, immediately transformed him into a favorite for the nomination, and he won it the next day. The Democrats nominated Arthur Sewall, a wealthy Maine banker and shipbuilder, for vice president. The left-wing Populist Party (which had hoped to nominate the only silver-supporting candidate) endorsed Bryan for president, but found Sewall unacceptable, substituting Thomas E. Watson of Georgia.

Abandoned by many gold-supporting party leaders and newspapers after the Chicago convention, Bryan undertook an extensive tour by rail to bring his campaign to the people. He spoke some 600 times, to an estimated 5,000,000 listeners. His campaign focused on silver, an issue that failed to appeal to the urban voter, and he was defeated in what is generally seen as a realigning election. The coalition of wealthy, middle-class and urban voters that defeated Bryan kept the Republicans in power for most of the time until 1932. Although defeated in the election, Bryan's campaign made him a national figure, which he remained until his death in 1925.

== Background ==
=== Bryan ===
William Jennings Bryan was born in rural Salem, Illinois, in 1860. His father, Silas Bryan, was a Jacksonian Democrat, judge, lawyer, and local party activist. As a judge's son, the younger Bryan had ample opportunity to observe the art of speechmaking in courtrooms, political rallies, and at church and revival meetings. In post-Civil War America, oratory was highly prized, and Bryan showed aptitude for it from a young age, raised in his father's house in Salem. Attending Illinois College beginning in 1877, Bryan devoted himself to winning the school prize for speaking. He won the prize in his junior year, and also secured the affection of Mary Baird, a student at a nearby women's academy. She became his wife, and was his principal assistant throughout his career.

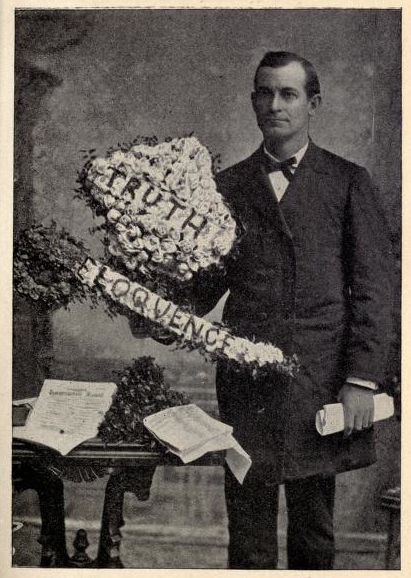
Bryan in 1890

While attending law school from 1881 to 1883, Bryan was a clerk to former Illinois senator Lyman Trumbull, who influenced him in a dislike for wealth and business monopolies. Bryan was strongly affected by the emerging Social Gospel movement that called on Protestant activists to seek to cure social problems such as poverty. Looking for a growing city in which his practice could thrive, he moved to Lincoln, Nebraska, in 1887.

Bryan quickly became prominent in Lincoln as a lawyer and a public speaker, becoming known as the "Boy Orator of the Platte". In 1890, he agreed to run for Congress against William James Connell, a Republican, who had won the local congressional seat in 1888. At that time, Nebraska was suffering hard times as many farmers had difficulties making ends meet due to low grain prices, and many Americans were discontented with the existing two major political parties. As a result, disillusioned farmers and others formed a new far-left party, which came to be known as the Populist Party. The Populists proposed both greater government control over the economy (with some calling for government ownership of railroads) and giving the people power over government through the secret ballot, direct election of United States Senators (who were, until 1913, elected by state legislatures), and replacement of the Electoral College with direct election of the president and vice president by popular vote. Party members in many states, including Nebraska, demanded inflation of the currency through issuance of paper or silver currency, allowing easier repayment of debt. After a candidate backed by the nascent Populists withdrew, Bryan defeated Connell for the seat by 6,700 votes (nearly doubling Connell's 1888 margin), receiving support from the Populists and Prohibitionists.

In Congress, Bryan was appointed to the powerful Ways and Means Committee and became a major spokesman on the tariff and money questions. He introduced several proposals for the direct election of senators and to eliminate tariff barriers in industries dominated by monopolies or trusts. This advocacy brought him contributions from silver mine owners in his successful re-election bid in 1892. In the 1892 presidential election, former Democratic president Grover Cleveland defeated the Republican incumbent, Benjamin Harrison, to regain his office. Bryan did not support Cleveland, making it clear he preferred the Populist candidate, James B. Weaver, though he indicated that as a loyal Democrat, he would vote the party ticket.

In May 1894, Bryan announced he would not seek re-election to the House of Representatives, feeling the incessant need to raise money to campaign in a marginal district was inhibiting his political career. Instead, he sought the Senate seat that the Nebraska legislature would fill in January 1895. Although Bryan was successful in winning the non-binding popular vote, Republicans gained a majority in the legislature and elected John Thurston as senator.

=== Economic depression; rise of free silver ===
The question of the currency had been a major political issue since the mid-1870s. Advocates of free silver (or bimetallism) wanted the government to accept all silver bullion presented to it and to return it, struck into coin, at the historic value ratio between gold and silver of 16 to 1. This would restore a practice abolished in 1873. A free silver policy would inflate the currency, as the silver in a dollar coin was worth just over half the face value. Someone who presented ten dollars in silver bullion would receive back almost twice that in silver coin. Advocates believed these proposals would lead to prosperity, while opponents warned that varying from the gold standard (which the United States had, effectively, used since 1873) would cause problems in international trade. The 1878 Bland–Allison Act and the Sherman Silver Purchase Act of 1890 required the government to buy large quantities of silver and strike it into coin. They had been passed as compromises between free silver and the gold standard.

Bryan, who had been elected after the passage of the latter enactment, initially had little to say on the subject. Free silver was very popular among Nebraskans, though many powerful Democrats opposed it. After his election to Congress, Bryan studied the currency question carefully, and came to believe in free silver; he also saw its political potential. By 1893, Bryan had become a leading supporter of free silver, arguing in a speech in St. Louis that the gold standard was deflationary "making a man pay a debt with a dollar larger than the one he borrowed ... If this robbery is permitted, the farmer will be ruined, and then the cities will suffer."

Even as Cleveland took office as president in March 1893, there were signs of an economic decline. Sherman's act required the government to pay out gold in exchange for silver and paper currency, and through the early months of 1893 gold flowed out of the Treasury. On April 22, 1893, the amount of gold in the Treasury dropped below $100 million for the first time since 1879, adding to the unease. Rumors that Europeans were about to redeem a large sum for gold caused desperate selling on the stock market, the start of the Panic of 1893. By August, many firms had gone bankrupt, and a special session of Congress convened, called by Cleveland to repeal the silver purchase act. Bryan, who was still in Congress, spoke eloquently against the repeal, but Cleveland forced it through. The President's uncompromising stand for gold alienated many in his own party (most southern and western Democrats were pro-silver). The economy failed to improve, and when the President in 1894 sent federal troops to Illinois to break up the Pullman Strike, he outraged even more Democrats. In late 1894, pro-silver Democrats began to organize in the hope of taking control of the party from Cleveland and other Gold Democrats and nominating a silver candidate in 1896. In this, they were led by Illinois Governor John Peter Altgeld, who had opposed Cleveland over the Pullman strike. The Democrats lost control of both houses of Congress in the 1894 midterm elections, with a number of southern states, usually solid for the Democrats, electing Republican or Populist congressmen.

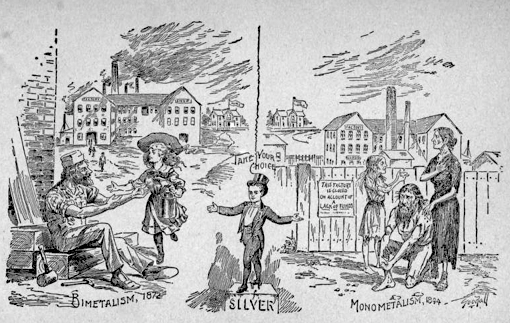
An illustration from Coin's Financial School; the young Coin (center) invites the reader to choose prosperity with free silver, or ruin with the gold standard.

In 1893, bimetallism had been just one of many proposals by Populists and others. As the economic downturn continued, free silver advocates blamed its continuation on the repeal of the silver purchase act, and the issue of silver became more prominent. Free silver especially resonated among farmers in the South and West, as well as miners. June 1894 marked the publication of William H. Harvey's Coin's Financial School. The book, composed of accounts of (fictitious) lectures on the silver issue given by an adolescent named Coin to Chicago audiences, became an immense bestseller. The book included (as foils to the title character) many of Chicago's most prominent men of business; some, such as banker and future Secretary of the Treasury Lyman Gage, issued denials that they had participated in any such lectures. This popular treatment of the currency issue was highly influential. A Missourian, Ezra Peters, wrote to Illinois Senator John M. Palmer, "Coins [sic] Financial School is raising h— in this neck of the woods. If those in favor of honest money don't do something to offset its influence the country is going to the dogs." Bryan called it: "the most potent of educational forces at work in behalf of bimetallism." A Minnesota correspondent wrote in Outlook magazine: "high school boys are about equally divided between silver and baseball, with a decided leaning toward the former".

== Dark horse candidate ==
=== Preparation ===
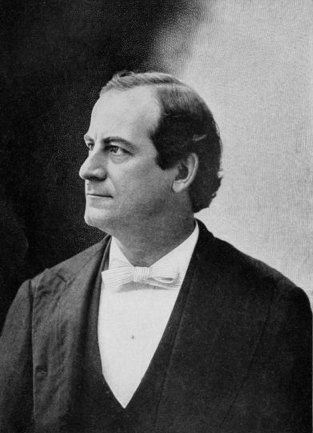
Bryan in 1896

In March 1895, the same month he left Congress, Bryan passed his 35th birthday, making him constitutionally eligible for the presidency. By then, he had come to see his nomination for that office as possible, even likely. Bryan believed he could use the coalition-building techniques he had applied in gaining election to Congress, uniting pro-silver forces behind him to gain the Democratic nomination and the presidency. To that end, it was important that the Populists not nominate a rival silver candidate, and he took pains to cultivate good relations with Populist leaders. Through 1895 and early 1896, Bryan sought to make himself as widely known as an advocate for silver as possible. He had accepted the nominal editorship of the Omaha World-Herald in August 1894. The position involved no day-to-day duties, but allowed him to publish his political commentaries. In the 17 months between his departure from Congress and the Democratic National Convention in July 1896, Bryan travelled widely through the South and West, speaking on silver. At every stop, he made contacts that he later cultivated. Several times, in his addresses, Bryan repeated variations on lines he had spoken in Congress in December 1894, decrying the gold standard, "I will not help to crucify mankind upon a cross of gold. I will not aid them to press down upon the bleeding brow of labor this crown of thorns."

Historian H. Wayne Morgan described Bryan:

Robert La Follette remembered Bryan as "a tall, slender, handsome fellow who looked like a young divine". A streak of the moralist preacher raised his political chances among a people attuned to the biblical phrase and Shakespearan [sic] stance. He was a fine actor, with a justly famous voice, but was not a charlatan. Bryan believed in the out-dated Jeffersonian virtues he preached in the Hamiltonian world of 1896 ... He was young, had a respectable but not burdensome record, came from the West, and understood the arts of conciliation. Though men thought otherwise at the time, neither fate nor accident created his position in the party.

Through early 1896, Bryan quietly sought the nomination. Any possible candidacy depended on silver supporters being successful in electing the bulk of convention delegates; accordingly Bryan backed such efforts. He maintained contact with silver partisans in other parties, hopeful of gathering them in after a nomination. His campaign was low-key, without excessive publicity: Bryan did not want to attract the attention of more prominent candidates. He continued to give speeches, and collected his traveling expenses, and most often a speaking fee, from those who had invited him.

Bryan faced a number of disadvantages in seeking the Democratic nomination: he was little-known among Americans who did not follow politics closely, he had no money to pour into his campaign, he lacked public office, and had incurred the enmity of Cleveland and his administration through his stance on silver and other issues. There was little advantage to the Democratic Party in nominating a candidate from Nebraska, a state small in population that had never voted for a Democrat. As state conventions met to nominate delegates to the July national convention, for the most part, they supported silver, and sent silver men to Chicago. Gold Democrats had success in the Northeast, and little elsewhere. Most state conventions did not bind, or "instruct", their delegates to vote for a specific candidate for the nomination; this course was strongly supported by Bryan. Once delegates were selected, Bryan wrote to party officials and obtained a list; he sent copies of his speeches, clippings from the World-Herald, and his photograph to each delegate.

In June 1896, Bryan's old teacher, former senator Trumbull died; on the day of his funeral, Bryan's mother also died, suddenly in Salem. Bryan spoke at her funeral, quoting lines from Second Timothy: "I have fought a good fight, I have finished my course, I have kept the faith." He also attended, as a correspondent for the World-Herald, the Republican convention that month in St. Louis. The Republicans, at the request of their nominee for president, former Ohio governor William McKinley, included a plank in their party platform supporting the gold standard. Bryan was deeply moved when, after the adoption of the platform, Colorado Senator Henry M. Teller led a walkout of silver-supporting Republicans. Bryan's biographer, Paolo Coletta, suggests that Bryan may have played a part in inciting the silver men's departure; he was in close contact with Silver Republicans such as Teller and South Dakota Senator Richard Pettigrew. Historian James Barnes wrote of Bryan's preparations:

The Nebraskan merely understood the political situation better than most of those who might have been his rivals, and he took advantage in a legitimate and thoroughly honorable manner of the existing conditions. He knew that hard work could turn the discontent of the people into a revolt against the gold wing of the party, and no group of individuals ever labored more diligently to gain their political ends than did the silver men in the [Democratic Party] between 1893 and 1896. Bryan sensed the possibility of becoming the nominee long before 1896; his ambition was fully matured several months prior to the convention, and there is evidence that his hopes were becoming tinged with certainty before he left for Chicago.

=== Convention ===
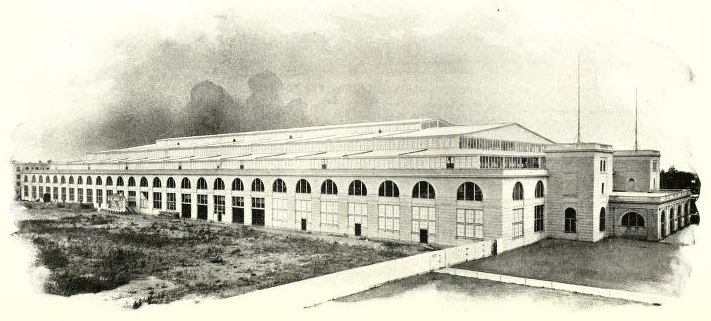
The Chicago Coliseum was the site of the 1896 Democratic National Convention.

In the run up to the Democratic National Convention, set to begin at the Chicago Coliseum on July 7, 1896, no candidate was seen as an overwhelming favorite for the presidential nomination. The leading candidates were former Missouri congressman Richard P. Bland and former Iowa governor Horace Boies. "Silver Dick" Bland was seen as the elder statesman of the silver movement; he had originated the Bland-Allison Act of 1878, while Boies's victories for governor in a normally Republican state made him attractive as a candidate who might compete with McKinley in the crucial Midwest. Both had openly declared their candidacies, and were the only Democrats to have organizations seeking to obtain pledged delegates. Neither candidate had much money to spend on his campaign. In addition to the frontrunners, other silver men were spoken of as candidates. These included Vice President Adlai Stevenson of Illinois, Senator Joseph C. Blackburn of Kentucky, Indiana Governor Claude Matthews, and Bryan. Illinois Governor Altgeld, a leader of the silver movement, was ineligible because he was not a natural-born U.S. citizen as required for the presidency in the Constitution. When Senator Teller walked out of the Republican convention in protest over the currency plank, he immediately became another possible candidate for the Democratic nomination for president. However, he was deemed unlikely to succeed, as many Democrats feared that if elected, he might fill some patronage jobs with Republicans. President Cleveland spent the week of the convention fishing, and had no comment about the events there; political scientist Richard Bensel attributes Cleveland's political inaction to the President's loss of influence in his party.

Bryan's Nebraska delegation left Lincoln by train on July 5. Carrying some 200 people, the train bore signs on each of its five cars, such as "The W.J. Bryan Club" and "Keep Your Eye on Nebraska." Bryan's strategy was simple: maintain a low profile as a candidate until the last possible moment, then give a speech that rallied the silver forces behind him and bring about his nomination. He was utterly confident that he would succeed, believing "the logic of the situation," as he later put it, dictated his selection. He explained to Champ Clark, the future Speaker of the House, that Bland and others from southern states would fall because of prejudice towards the old Confederacy, that Boies could not be nominated because he was too little-known, and all others would fail due to lack of support—leaving only himself.

Coletta noted the problems faced by Bryan in obtaining the nomination, and how his groundwork helped overcome them:

The maneuver that paid Bryan highest dividends was his fifteen months of missionary work in behalf of silver and cultivation of the Chicago delegates. He knew personally more delegates than did any other candidate ... and he was on the ground to supervise his strategy. When he spoke of himself as the nominee, some reacted as [journalist] Willis J. Abbot did and doubted his mental capacity. How could a boy in appearance, one not yet admitted to the convention, without a single state behind him, dare claim the nomination? The answer was simple, Bryan told Abbot—he had prepared a speech that would stampede the convention.

Bryan stayed at the Clifton House, a modest hotel adjoining the opulent Palmer House. A large banner outside the Clifton House proclaimed the presence of Nebraska's delegation headquarters, but did not mention Bryan's campaign, which was run from Nebraska's rooms. The main candidates headquartered at the Palmer House, their rooms often crowded as they served free alcoholic drinks. The Coliseum was located in a "dry" district of Chicago but the hotels were not.

Just before the convention, the Democratic National Committee (DNC) made initial determinations of which delegations were to be seated—once convened, delegates would make the final determination after the convention's Credentials Committee reported. The DNC seated a rival, pro-gold Nebraska delegation, and recommended New York Senator David B. Hill as the convention's temporary chairman, each by a vote of 27–23. Bryan was present when it was announced that his delegation would not be initially seated; reports state he acted "somewhat surprised" at the outcome. Since the DNC action meant Bryan would not have a seat at the start of proceedings, he could not be the temporary chairman (who would deliver the keynote address); the Nebraskan began looking for other opportunities to make a speech at the convention. Historian James A. Barnes deemed the DNC's vote immaterial; once the convention met on July 7, it quickly elected a silver man, Virginia Senator John Daniel, as temporary chairman and appointed a committee to review credentials friendly to the silver cause.

As the committees met, the convention proceeded, though in considerable confusion. Many of the silver men had not attended a national convention before, and were unfamiliar with its procedures. Members of the Committee on Resolutions (also called the Platform Committee) intended to elect California Senator Stephen M. White as chairman; they found that he had already been co-opted as permanent chairman of the convention. Bryan had been widely supported as a candidate for permanent chairman by the silver men, but some western delegates on the Committee on Permanent Organization objected, stating that they wanted the chance to support Bryan for the nomination (the permanent chairman was customarily ruled out as a candidate).

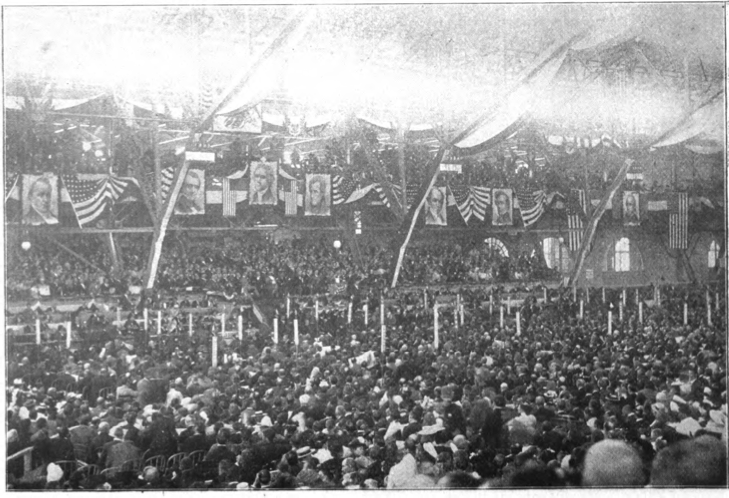
The 1896 Democratic National Convention

Delegates spent most of the first two days listening to various speeches by silver supporters. The first report from the Credentials Committee, on the afternoon of July 8, recommended the seating of Bryan's delegation. This was a matter of intense interest for the silver delegates: Bryan had written to large numbers of delegates urging them to support his men over their gold rivals; once in Chicago, he and his fellow Nebraskans had spoken with many others about the dispute. The convention, by voice vote, seated the silver Nebraskans, who arrived in the convention hall a few minutes later, accompanied by a band. Soon afterwards, the delegates, bored, shouted for a speech from Bryan, but he was not to be found.

Once seated, Bryan went to the Platform Committee meeting at the Palmer House, displacing the Nebraska gold delegate on the committee. The proposed platform was pro-silver; Senator Hill had offered an amendment backing the gold standard, which had been defeated by committee vote. As Hill was determined to take the platform fight to the full convention, the committee discussed who should speak in the debate, and allocated 75 minutes to each side. South Carolina Senator Benjamin Tillman, a silver supporter, wanted an hour to address the convention, and to close the debate. When both Hill and Bryan (who was selected as the other pro-silver speaker) objected to such a long closing address, Tillman settled for 50 minutes and for opening the debate rather than closing it; Bryan was given 25 minutes to close. Bryan later asked the Platform Committee chairman, Arkansas Senator James K. Jones why he was given such a crucial role as closing the platform debate; Senator Jones responded that he had three reasons: Bryan's long service in the silver cause, the Nebraskan was the only major speaker not to have addressed the convention, and that Jones had a sore throat. That evening, Bryan dined with his wife and with friends. Looking upon the loud Boies and Bland supporters, Bryan commented, "These people don't know it, but they will be cheering for me just this way tomorrow night."

=== Speech ===
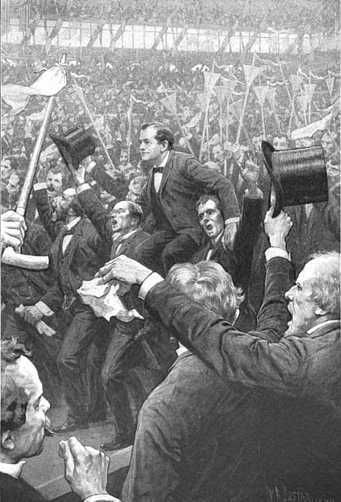
Artist's sketch of Bryan carried on the shoulders of delegates after making the Cross of Gold speech

On the morning of July 9, 1896, thousands of people waited outside the Coliseum, hoping to hear the platform debate. The galleries were quickly packed, but the delegates, slowed by fatigue from the first two days and the long journey from the downtown hotels, were slower to arrive. It was not until 10:45 am, three-quarters of an hour late, that Chairman White called the convention to order. Bryan arrived during the delay; he was greeted with a musical tribute from one of the convention bands, (Note: The song was "Sift Sand, Sal", the source does not explain the relevance of this to Bryan.) which then returned to playing a medley of Irish melodies. Once White started the proceedings, he turned over the gavel to Senator Jones, who read the proposed platform to great applause from silver delegates, and hissing from gold men. The minority report attracted the opposite reaction.

Senator Tillman, a fiery speaker who wore a pitchfork on his lapel, began the debate. His speech, set as the only one besides Bryan's in favor of silver, portrayed silver as a sectional issue pitting the poorer folk of the South and West against gold-supporting New York and the rest of the Northeast. It was badly received even by silver delegates, who wished to think of silver as a patriotic, national issue. Senator Jones felt compelled to spend five minutes (granted by the gold side), stating that the silver issue crossed sectional lines. New York Senator Hill was next: the leading spokesman for gold, both gold and silver delegates quieted to hear him. He was followed by Senator William Vilas of Wisconsin and former Massachusetts Governor William D. Russell. Each made their cases for gold, and likely changed few votes. Only Bryan was left to speak, and no one at the convention had yet effectively championed the silver cause. The New York Times described the setting:

There never was such a propitious moment for such an orator than that which fell to Bryan. The minority [gold faction] had just been pleased and the majority had just been depressed and mortified by the appearance, as the champion of free silver, of Tillman ... The minority had indicated its position. The majority felt exposed, crestfallen, and humiliated.

Writer Edgar Lee Masters, who witnessed Bryan's speech, remembered, "Suddenly I saw a man spring up from his seat among the delegates and with the agility and swiftness of an eager boxer hurry to the speaker's rostrum. He was slim, tall, pale, raven-haired, beaked of nose." The Nebraska delegation waved red handkerchiefs as Bryan progressed to the podium; he wore an alpaca sack suit more typical of Lincoln and the West than of Chicago. There was loud cheering as Bryan stood at the lectern; it took him a full minute to gain silence. He began:

I would be presumptuous, indeed, to present myself against the distinguished gentlemen to whom you have listened if this were a mere measuring of abilities; but this is not a contest between persons. The humblest citizen in all the land, when clad in the armor of a righteous cause, is stronger than all the hosts of error. I come to speak to you in defense of a cause as holy as the cause of liberty—the cause of humanity.

Bryan, with this declaration, set the theme of his argument, and as it would prove, his campaign: that the welfare of humanity was at stake with the silver issue. According to his biographer Michael Kazin, "Bryan felt he was serving his part in a grander conflict that began with Christ and showed no sign of approaching its end." From the start, Bryan had his audience: when he finished a sentence, they would rise, shout and cheer, then quiet themselves to ready for the next words; the Nebraskan later described the convention as like a trained choir. He dismissed arguments that the business men of the East favored the gold standard:

We say to you that you have made the definition of a business man too limited in its application. The man who is employed for wages is as much a business man as his employer; the attorney in a country town is as much a business man as the corporation counsel in a great metropolis; the merchant at the cross-roads store is as much a business man as the merchant of New York; the farmer who goes forth in the morning and toils all day, who begins in spring and toils all summer, and who by the application of brain and muscle to the natural resources of the country creates wealth, is as much a business man as the man who goes upon the Board of Trade and bets upon the price of grain; the miners who go down a thousand feet into the earth, or climb two thousand feet upon the cliffs, and bring forth from their hiding places the precious metals to be poured into the channels of trade are as much business men as the few financial magnates who, in a back room, corner the money of the world. We come to speak of this broader class of business men.

Many of the elements of the speech had appeared in prior Bryan addresses. However, the business man argument was new, though he had hinted at it in an interview he gave at the Republican convention. Bryan always regarded that argument as the speech's most powerful part, despite the fame its conclusion would gain. He responded to an argument by Senator Vilas that from silver forces might arise a Robespierre. Bryan affirmed that the people could be counted on to prevent the rise of a tyrant, and noted, "What we need is an Andrew Jackson to stand, as Jackson stood, against the encroachments of organized wealth." He continued:

Upon which side will the Democratic Party fight; upon the side of "the idle holders of idle capital" or upon the side of "the struggling masses"? (Note: Bryan was quoting from an 1878 speech by Cleveland's Treasury Secretary, John G. Carlisle. The quotation marks were omitted in some early printings of the Cross of Gold speech, leading to charges of plagiarism, although Bryan credits Carlisle during the speech.) That is the question which the party must answer first, and then it must be answered by each individual hereafter. The sympathies of the Democratic Party, as shown by the platform, are on the side of the struggling masses, who have ever been the foundation of the Democratic Party.

Bryan concluded the address, seizing a place in American history:

Having behind us the producing masses of this nation and the world, supported by the commercial interests, the laboring interests, and the toilers everywhere, we will answer their demand for a gold standard by saying to them: "You shall not press down upon the brow of labor this crown of thorns; you shall not crucify mankind upon a cross of gold."

As he spoke his final sentence, he brought his hands to his head, fingers extended in imitation of thorns; amid dead silence in the Coliseum, he extended his arms, recalling with words and posture the Crucifixion of Jesus, and held that position for several seconds. He then lowered his arms, and began the journey back to his seat in the silence.

Bryan described the stillness as "really painful"; his anxieties that he might have failed were soon broken by pandemonium. The New York World reported, "The floor of the convention seemed to heave up. Everybody seemed to go mad at once." In a demonstration of some half an hour, Bryan was carried around the floor, then surrounded with cheering supporters. Men and women threw their hats into the air, not caring where they might come down. Delegates were shouting to begin the vote and nominate Bryan immediately, which he refused to consider, feeling that if his appeal could not last overnight, it would not last until November. Bryan left the convention, returning to his hotel to await the outcome. In the midst of the crazed crowd, Altgeld, a Bland supporter, commented to his friend, lawyer Clarence Darrow, "That is the greatest speech I ever listened to. I don't know but its effect will be to nominate him."

=== Nomination ===
When order was restored after Bryan's speech, the convention passed the platform, voting down the minority report and a resolution in support of the Cleveland administration; it then recessed for a few hours until 8:00 pm, when nominating speeches were to be made. According to The Boston Globe, Bryan "had locked himself within the four walls at the Clifton House, down town, and there blushes unseen. The dark horse is in his stall, feasting on the oats of hope and political straws." Bryan had made no arrangements for formal nominating speeches given the short timeframe, and was surprised when word was brought to him at the Clifton House that he had been nominated by Henry Lewis of Georgia: the candidate had expected the Kansas delegation to name him. As Missouri Senator George Vest nominated Bland, his oratory was drowned out by the gallery, "Bryan, Bryan, W.J. Bryan".

The balloting for the presidential nomination was held on July 10, the day after the speech; a two-thirds majority was needed to nominate. Bryan remained at his hotel, sending word to his fellow Nebraskans, "There must be no pledging, no promising, on any subject with anybody. No delegation must be permitted to violate instructions given by a state convention. Our delegation should not be too prominent in applause. Treat all candidates fairly." On the first ballot, Bryan had 137 votes, mostly from Nebraska and four southern states, trailing Bland who had 235; Boies was fourth with 67 votes and was never a factor in the balloting. Bland maintained his lead on the second and third ballots, but on the fourth, with the convention in a huge uproar, Bryan took the lead. Governor Altgeld had held Illinois, which was subject to the "unit rule" whereby the entirety of a state's vote was cast as a majority of that state's delegation directed. After the fourth ballot, the Illinois delegation caucused and Altgeld was one of only two remaining Bland supporters, thus giving Bryan all of the state's 48 votes and bringing him near the two-thirds mark and the nomination. On the fifth ballot, other states joined the Bryan bandwagon, making him the Democratic candidate for president.

I will add for the encouragement of those who still believe that money is not necessary to secure a Presidential nomination that my entire expenses while in attendance upon the convention were less than $100.

— William Jennings Bryan, The First Battle: A Story of the Campaign of 1896

At the Clifton House, Bryan's rooms were overwhelmed with those wishing to congratulate him, despite the efforts of police to keep the crowds at bay. Bryan quipped, "I seem to have plenty of friends now, but I remember well when they were very few." He left the choice of a running mate to the convention; delegates selected Maine shipbuilder Arthur Sewall. Active in Democratic Party politics, Sewall was one of the few eastern party leaders to support silver, was wealthy and could help finance the campaign; he also balanced the ticket geographically. According to historian Stanley Jones in his account of the 1896 election, "it seemed in retrospect a curious logic that gave a capitalist from Maine a leading role in a campaign intended to have a strong appeal to the masses of the South and West". Bryan and Sewall gained their nominations without the ballots of the gold men, most of whom refused to vote. Amid talk that the Gold Democrats would form their own party, Senator Hill was asked if he remained a Democrat. "I was a Democrat before the Convention and am a Democrat still—very still."

== General election campaign ==
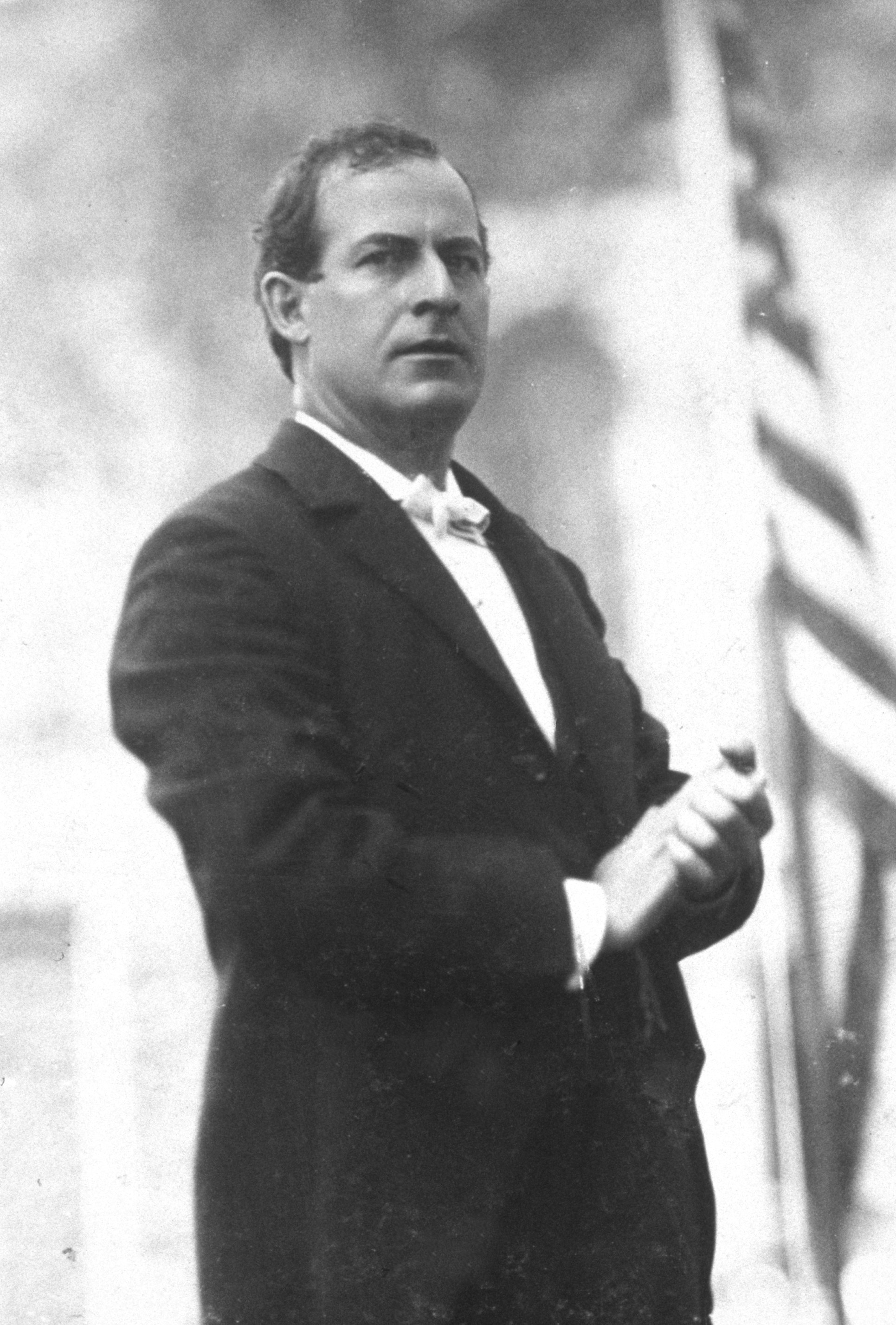
Bryan, seen during the 1896 campaign

Bryan's nomination was denounced by many establishment Democrats. President Cleveland, stunned by the convention's repudiation of him and his policies, decided against open support for a bolt from the party, either by endorsing McKinley or by publicly backing a rival Democratic ticket. Nevertheless, Gold Democrats began plans to hold their own convention, which took place in September. Many Cleveland supporters decried Bryan as no true Democrat, but a fanatic and socialist, his nomination procured through demagoguery. Some of the Democratic political machines, such as New York's Tammany Hall, decided to ignore the national ticket and concentrate on electing local and congressional candidates. Large numbers of traditionally Democratic newspapers refused to support Bryan, including the New York World, whose circulation of 800,000 was the nation's largest, and major dailies in cities such as Philadelphia, Detroit, and Brooklyn. Southern newspapers stayed with Bryan; they were unwilling to endorse McKinley, the choice of most African Americans, though few of them could vote in the South. Newspapers that supported other parties in western silver states, such as the Populist Rocky Mountain News of Denver, Colorado, and Utah's Republican The Salt Lake Tribune, quickly endorsed Bryan.

Following his nomination in June, McKinley's team had believed that the election would be fought on the issue of the protective tariff. Chicago banker Charles G. Dawes, a McKinley advisor who had known Bryan when both lived in Lincoln, had predicted to McKinley and his friend and campaign manager, Mark Hanna, that if Bryan had the chance to speak to the convention, he would be its choice. McKinley and Hanna gently mocked Dawes, telling him that Bland would be the nominee. In the three weeks between the two conventions, McKinley spoke only on the tariff question, and when journalist Murat Halstead telephoned him from Chicago to inform him that Bryan would be nominated, he responded dismissively and hung up the phone. When Bryan was nominated on a silver platform, the Republicans were briefly gratified, believing that Bryan's selection would result in an easy victory for McKinley.

Despite the confidence of the Republicans, the nomination of Bryan sparked great excitement through the nation. His program of prosperity through free silver struck an emotional chord with the American people in a way that McKinley's protective tariff did not. Many Republican leaders had gone on vacation for the summer, believing that the fight, on their terms, would take place in the fall. Bryan's endorsement, soon after Chicago, by the Populists, his statement that he would undertake a nationwide tour on an unprecedented scale, and word from local activists of the strong silver sentiment in areas Republicans had to win to take the election, jarred McKinley's party from its complacency.

=== Populist nominee ===
The Populist strategy for 1896 was to nominate the candidate most supportive of silver. Populist leaders correctly believed the Republicans unlikely to nominate a silver man. They hoped the Democrats either would not endorse silver in their platform or if they did, that the Democratic candidate would be someone who could be painted as weak on silver. Bryan's sterling record on the issue left the Populists with a stark choice: they could endorse Bryan, and risk losing their separate identity as a party, or nominate another candidate, thus dividing the pro-silver vote to McKinley's benefit. According to Stanley Jones, "the Democratic endorsement of silver and Bryan at Chicago precipitated the disintegration" of the Populist Party; it was never again a force in national politics after 1896.

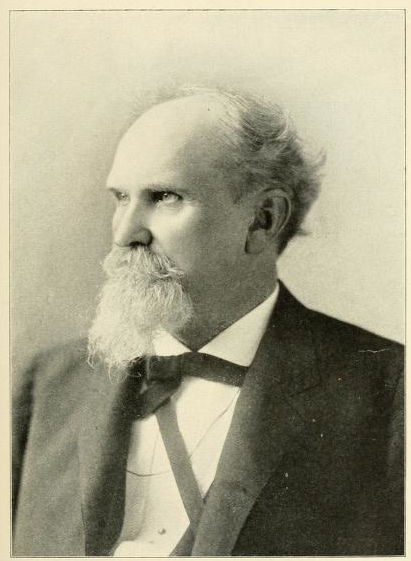
Arkansas Senator James K. Jones, as chairman of the Democratic National Committee, served as Bryan's campaign manager.

Even before their convention in late July, the Populists faced dissent in their ranks. Former Populist governor of Colorado Davis H. Waite wrote to former congressman Ignatius Donnelly that the Democrats had returned to their roots and "nominated a good & true man on the platform. Of course I support him." Populist Kansas Congressman Jerry Simpson wrote, "I care not for party names. It is the substance we are after, and we have it with William J. Bryan." Many Populists saw the election of Bryan, whose positions on many issues were not far from theirs, as the quickest path to the reforms they sought; a majority of delegates to the convention in St. Louis favored him. However, many delegates disliked Sewall because of his wealth and ownership of a large business, and believed that nominating someone else would keep Populist issues alive in the campaign. Although they nominated Bryan for president, they chose Georgia's Thomas E. Watson as vice-presidential candidate; some hoped Bryan would dump Sewall from his ticket. Bryan did not; Senator Jones (as the new Democratic National Committee chairman, in charge of the campaign) stated, "Mr. Sewall, will, of course, remain on the ticket, and Mr. Watson can do what he likes."

Historian R. Hal Williams, in his book about the 1896 campaign, believes that the Populist nomination did Bryan little good; most Populists would have voted for him anyway and the endorsement allowed his opponents to paint him and his supporters as extremists. The vice presidential squabble, Williams argues, worried voters who feared that instability would follow a Bryan victory, and drove them towards McKinley. Populist leader Henry Demarest Lloyd described silver as the "cow-bird" of the Populist Party, which had pushed aside all other issues. The National Silver Party, mostly former Republicans, met at the same time as the Populists; both conventions were in St. Louis. They quickly endorsed Bryan and Sewall, urging all silver forces to unite behind that ticket.

=== New York visit ===
After the Democratic convention, Bryan had returned triumphantly to Lincoln, making speeches along the way. At home, he took a short rest, and was visited by Senator Jones to discuss plans for the campaign. Bryan was not interested in campaign organization; what he wanted from the DNC was enough money to conduct a national tour by train. The campaign, as it proved, was badly organized: This was Jones's first national campaign, and the party structure in many states was either only newly in the control of silver forces, or in gold states wanted no part of the national ticket. With little money, poor organization, and a hostile press, Bryan was his campaign's most important asset, and he wanted to reach the voters by traveling to them. According to Stanley Jones in his study of the 1896 campaign, "Bryan expected that he alone, carrying to the people the message of free silver, would win the election for his party."

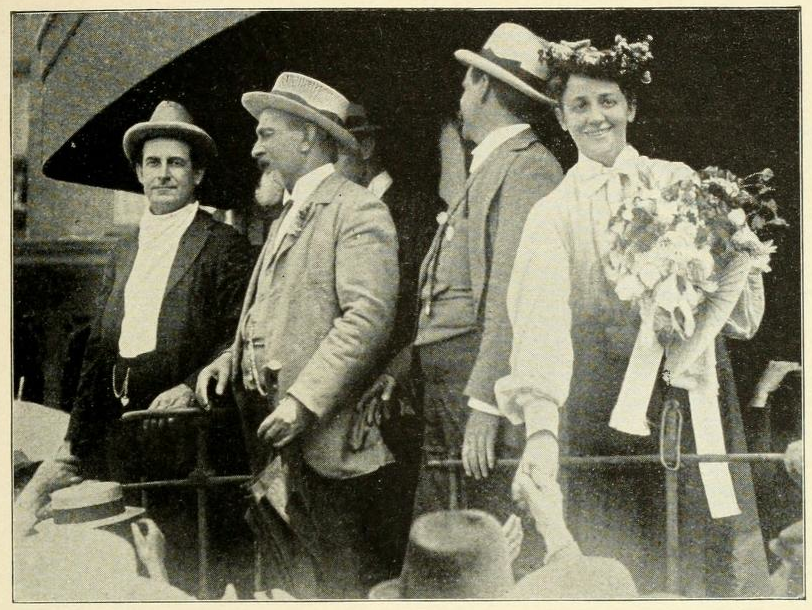
Bryan (left) and his wife Mary at Crestline, Ohio, en route to New York for the acceptance, August 10, 1896

Bryan set the formal acceptance of his nomination for August 12 at New York's Madison Square Garden; he left Lincoln five days earlier by rail, and spoke 38 times along the way, sometimes from the trackside in his nightgown. While speaking in McKinley's hometown of Canton, Ohio, Bryan yielded to impulse and called upon his rival at his home with Congressman Bland; the Republican candidate and his wife, somewhat startled, received the two men hospitably in a scene Williams calls, "surely bizarre." August 12 was an extremely hot day in New York, which was mired in a 10-day heat wave, especially for the crowd jammed into the Garden. When Missouri Governor William J. Stone, chair of the notification committee, essayed a lengthy speech, he was drowned out by the crowd, which wanted to hear "the Boy Orator of the Platte". Many were disappointed; the Democratic candidate read a two-hour speech from a manuscript, wishing to look statesmanlike, and fearing that if he spoke without a script, the press would misrepresent his words. Many seats were vacant before he concluded.

After several days in upstate New York, during which he had a dinner with Senator Hill (Note: Hill remained neutral in the campaign, despite urgings to go over to the Gold Democrats, seeking to preserve his control of the state Democratic party, and also hoping (in vain) to secure his own re-election by the legislature. See Jones, p. 393 n.13) at which the subject of politics was carefully avoided, Bryan began a circuitous journey back to Lincoln by train. At a speech in Chicago on Labor Day, Bryan varied from the silver issue to urge regulation of corporations. According to Stanley Jones,

The period of this tour, in the return from New York to Lincoln, was the high point of the Bryan campaign. Bryan was well rested. After invading "the enemy's country", (Note: As Bryan had called New York in an ill-considered statement to the press before leaving Lincoln.) he was returning to his own territory. Wherever his train went people, who had travelled from nearby farms and villages, waved and shouted encouragement. Their enthusiasm at the unrehearsed rear platform appearances and in the formal speeches was spontaneous and contagious. The smell of victory seemed to hang in the air. Perhaps a vote taken then would have given Bryan the election.

=== Whistle-stop tour ===
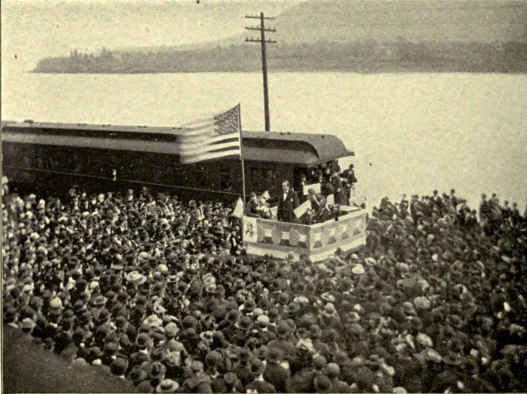
Bryan's whistle-stop tours during the 1896 campaign were unprecedented. Here he addresses a crowd in Wellsville, Ohio.

Bryan's plan for victory was to undertake a strenuous train tour, bringing his message to the people. Although Hanna and other advisors urged McKinley to get on the road, the Republican candidate declined to match Bryan's gambit, deciding that not only was the Democrat a better stump speaker, but that however McKinley travelled, Bryan would upstage him by journeying in a less comfortable way. McKinley's chosen strategy was a front porch campaign; he would remain at home, giving carefully scripted speeches to visiting delegations, much to the gratification of Canton's hot dog vendors and souvenir salesmen, who expanded facilities to meet the demand. Meanwhile, Hanna raised millions from business men to pay for speakers on the currency question and to flood the nation with hundreds of millions of pamphlets. Starved of money, the Democrats had fewer speakers and fewer publications to issue. Bryan's supporters raised at most $500,000 for the 1896 campaign; McKinley's raised at least $3.5 million. Among the foremost supporters of Bryan was publisher William Randolph Hearst who both contributed to Bryan's campaign and slanted his newspapers' coverage in his favor.

On September 11, 1896, Bryan departed on a train trip that continued until November 1, two days before the election. At first, he rode in public cars, and made his own travel arrangements, looking up train schedules and even carrying his own bags from train station to hotel. By early October, the DNC, at the urging of Populist officials who felt Bryan was being worn out, procured the services of North Carolina journalist Josephus Daniels to make travel arrangements, and also obtained a private railroad car, The Idler—a name Bryan thought somewhat inappropriate due to the strenuous nature of the tour. Mary Bryan had joined her husband in late September; on The Idler, the Bryans were able to eat and sleep in relative comfort.

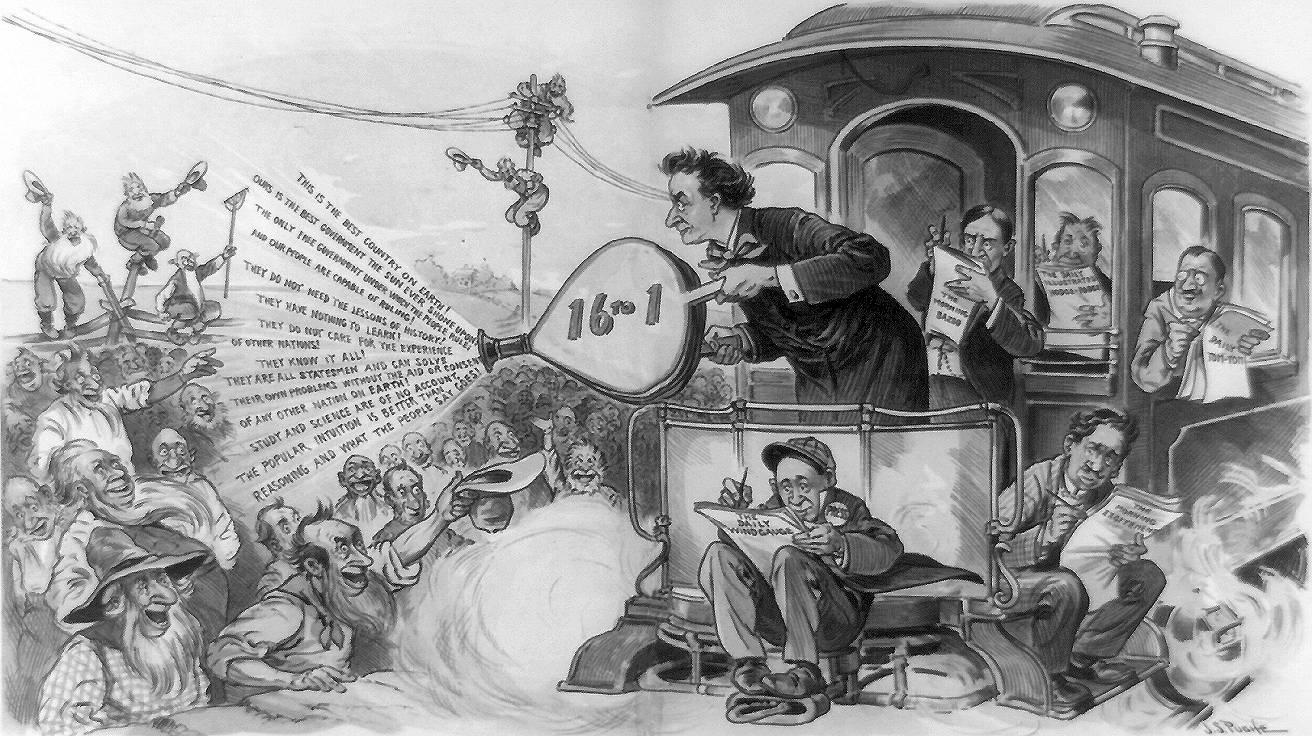
Bryan's whistle-stop campaign, as mocked by Puck magazine

During this tour, Bryan spoke almost exclusively on the silver question, and attempted to mold the speeches to reflect local issues and interests. He did not campaign on Sundays, but on most other days spoke between 20 and 30 times. Crowds assembled hours or days ahead of Bryan's arrival. The train bearing The Idler pulled in after a short journey from the last stop, and after he was greeted by local dignitaries, Bryan would give a brief speech addressing silver and the need for the people to retake the government. The shortness of the speech did not dismay the crowds, who knew his arguments well: they were there to see and hear William Jennings Bryan—one listener told him that he had read every one of his speeches, and had ridden 50 miles (80 km) to hear him, "And, by gum, if I wasn't a Republican, I'd vote for you." After a brief interval for handshakes, the train would pull out again, to another town down the track.

Throughout the nation, voters were intensely interested in the campaign, studying the flood of pamphlets. Speakers for both parties found eager audiences. Arthur F. Mullen, a resident of O'Neill, Nebraska, described the summer and fall of 1896:

O'Neill buzzed with political disputation from dawn till next dawn. A bowery had been built for the Fourth of July picnic and dance. Ordinarily, it was torn down after that event. In 1896 it was kept as a forum, and by day and night men and women met there to talk about the Crime of '73, the fallacies of the gold standard, bimetallism and international consent, the evils of the tariff, the moneybags of Mark Hanna, the front porch campaign of McKinley. They read W. H. Harvey's Coin's Financial School to themselves, their friends, and opponents ... They read Bryan when they couldn't go off to listen to him.

Bryan rarely emphasized other issues than silver; leader of a disparate coalition linked by the silver question, he feared alienating some of his supporters. He occasionally addressed other subjects: in an October speech in Detroit, he spoke out against the Supreme Court's decision ruling the federal income tax unconstitutional. He promised to enforce the laws against the trusts, procure stricter ones from Congress, and if the Supreme Court struck them down, to seek a constitutional amendment. In what Williams describes as "a political campaign that became an American legend", Bryan traveled to 27 of the 45 states, logging 18,000 miles (29,000 km), and in his estimated 600 speeches reached some 5,000,000 listeners.

=== Attacks and Gold Democrats; the final days ===
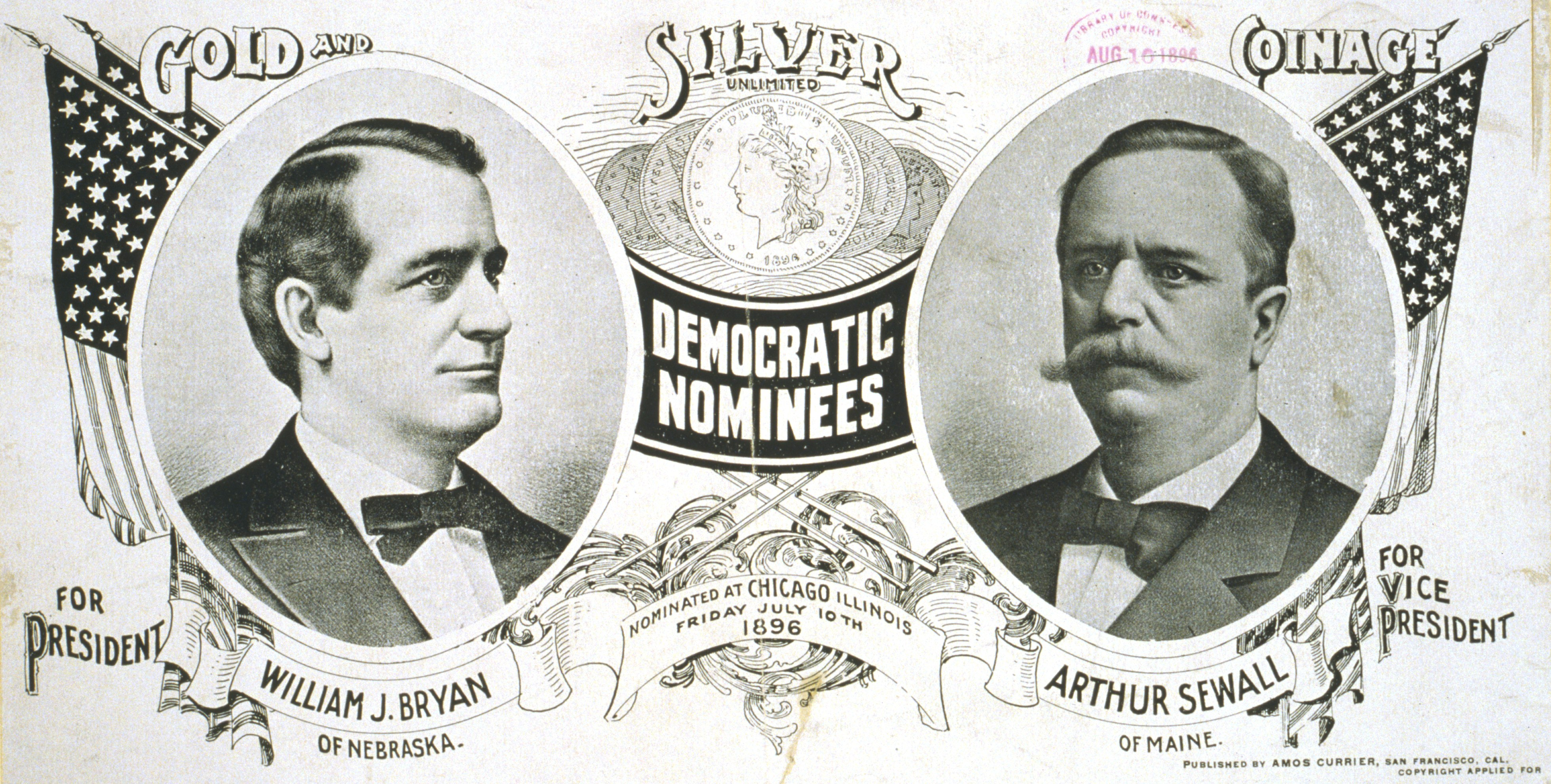
Bryan/Sewall campaign poster

Republican newspapers painted Bryan as a tool of Governor Altgeld, who was controversial for having pardoned the surviving men convicted of involvement in the Haymarket bombing. Others dubbed Bryan a "Popocrat". On September 27, The New York Times published a letter by an "eminent alienist" who, based on an analysis of the candidate's speeches, concluded that Bryan was mad. The paper editorialized on the same page that even if the Democratic candidate was not insane, he was at least "of unsound mind". For the most part, Bryan ignored the attacks, and made light of them in his account of the 1896 campaign. Republican newspapers and spokesmen claimed that Bryan's campaign was expensively financed by the silver interests. This was not the case: the mining industry was seeing poor times, and had little money to donate to Bryan. (Note: The Democrats did gain some financing from the mine owners, although it is uncertain how much. See Jones, pp. 301–302) In his account, Bryan quoted a letter by Senator Jones: "No matter in how small sums, no matter by what humble contributions, let the friends of liberty and national honor contribute all they can to the good cause."

In September, the Gold Democrats met in convention in Indianapolis. Loyal to Cleveland, they wanted to nominate him. However, the President ruled this out; his Cabinet members also refused to run. Not even supporters thought the Gold Democrats would win; the purpose was to have a candidate who would speak for the gold element in the party, and who would divide the vote and defeat Bryan. Illinois Senator John M. Palmer was eager to be the presidential candidate, and the convention nominated him with Kentucky's Simon Bolivar Buckner as his running mate. Palmer was a 79-year-old former Union general, Buckner a 73-year-old former Confederate of that rank; the ticket was the oldest in combined age in American history, and Palmer the second-oldest presidential candidate (behind Peter Cooper of the Greenback Party; Bryan was the youngest). The Gold Democrats received quiet financial support from Hanna and the Republicans. Palmer proved an able campaigner who visited most major cities in the East, and in the final week of his campaign, told listeners, "I will not count it any great fault if next Tuesday you decide to cast your ballots for William McKinley."

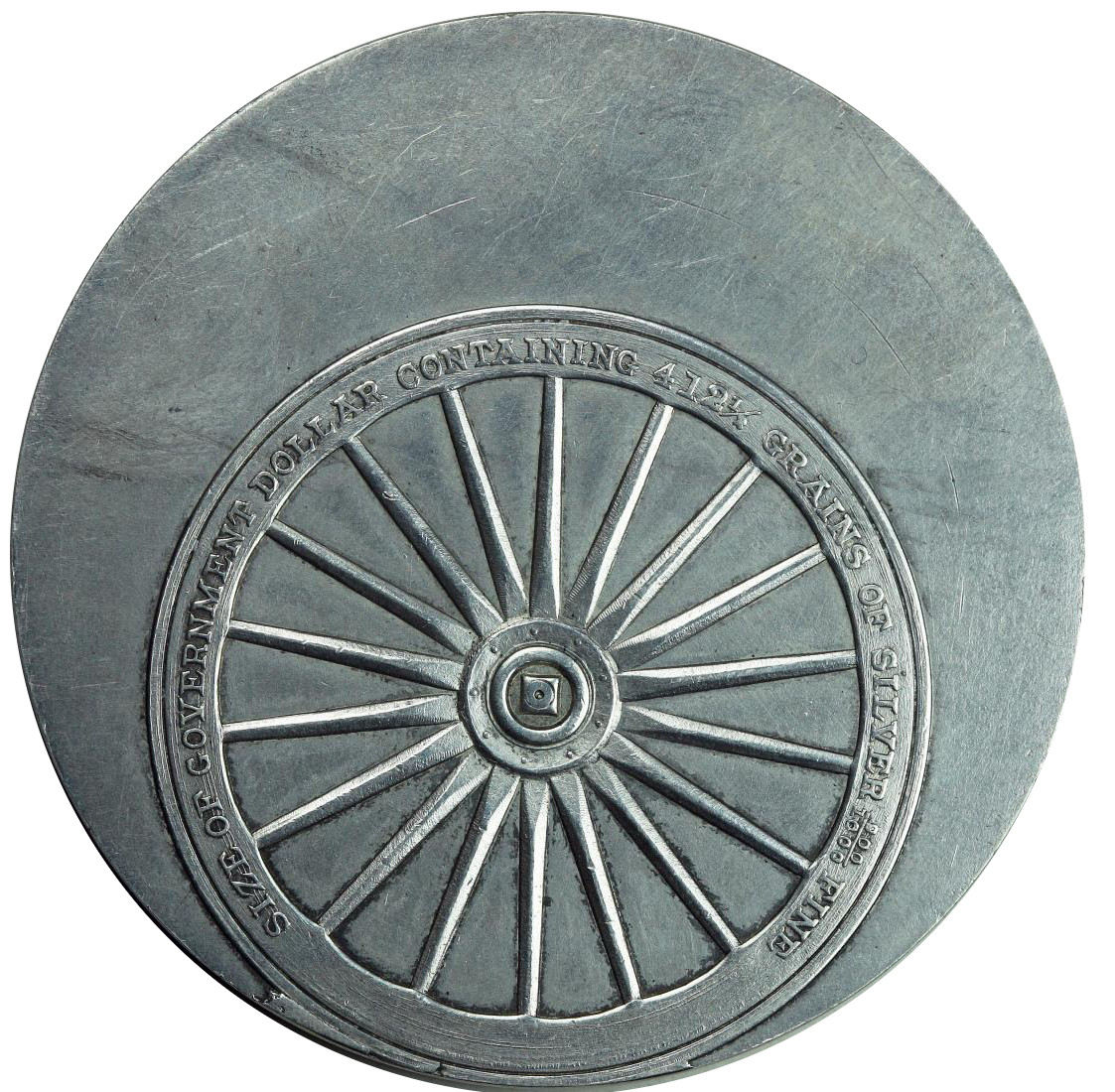
A "Bryan dollar" issued by his opponents to illustrate the difference between the size of a silver dollar and the amount of bullion that could be purchased with a dollar.

The South and most of the West were deemed certain to vote for Bryan. When early-voting Maine and Vermont went strongly Republican in September, this meant that McKinley would most likely win the Northeast. These results made the Midwest the crucial battlefield that would decide the presidency. Bryan spent most of October there—160 of his final 250 train stops were in the Midwest. Early Republican polls had shown Bryan ahead in crucial Midwestern states, including McKinley's Ohio. Much of the blizzard of paper the Republican campaign was able to pay for concentrated on this area. By September, this had its effect as silver sentiment began to fade. Morgan noted, "full organization, [Republican] party harmony, a campaign of education with the printed and spoken word would more than counteract" Bryan's speechmaking. Beginning in September, the Republicans concentrated on the tariff question, and as Election Day, November 3, approached, they were confident of victory.

William and Mary Bryan returned to Lincoln on November 1, two days before the election. He was not yet done with campaigning, however; on November 2, he undertook a train journey across Nebraska in support of Democratic congressional candidates. He made 27 speeches, including seven in Omaha, the last concluding a few minutes before midnight. His train reached Lincoln after the polls opened; he journeyed from train station to polling place to his house escorted by a mounted troop of supporters. He slept much of the evening of election day, to be wakened by his wife with telegrams showing the election was most likely lost.

=== Election ===
Map showing the results of the 1896 campaign, with electoral votes won noted. States won by Bryan are in blue.

The 1896 presidential election was close by modern measurements, but less so by the standards of the day, which had seen close-run elections over the previous 20 years. McKinley won with 7.1 million votes to Bryan's 6.5 million, 51% to 47%. The electoral vote was not as close: 271 for McKinley to 176 for Bryan. The nation was regionally split, with the industrial East and Midwest for McKinley, and with Bryan carrying the Solid South and the silver strongholds of the Rocky Mountain states. McKinley did well in the border states of Maryland, West Virginia, and Kentucky. Although Bryan claimed that many employers had intimidated their workers into voting Republican, Williams points out that the Democrats benefited from the disenfranchisement of southern African Americans. Palmer received less than 1% of the vote, but his vote total in Kentucky was greater than McKinley's margin of victory there. Confusion over ballots in Minnesota resulted in 15,000 voided votes and may have thrown that state to the Republicans.

In most areas, Bryan did better among rural voters than urban. Even in the South, Bryan attracted 59% of the rural vote, but only 44% of the urban vote, taking 57% of the southern vote overall. The only areas of the nation where Bryan took a greater percentage of the urban than the rural vote were New England and the Rocky Mountain states; in neither case did this affect the outcome, as Bryan took only 27% of New England's vote overall, while taking 88% of the Rocky Mountain city vote to 81% of the vote there outside the cities. (Note: In New England, Cleveland had won Connecticut in 1892 while losing the region as a whole by 53,000 votes, Bryan won no states and lost New England by over 172,000 votes. See Jones, pp. 341–347 Outside of those regions, Bryan took a greater percentage of the urban vote than the rural only in New Jersey, Wisconsin, and Virginia; he won only the last of the three. See Diamond, p. 295) McKinley even won the urban vote in Nebraska. Most cities that were financial or manufacturing centers voted for McKinley. Those that served principally as agricultural centers or had been founded along the railroad favored Bryan. The Democratic Party preserved control in the eastern cities through machine politics and the continued loyalty of the Irish-American voter; Bryan's loss over the silver issue of many German-American voters, previously solidly Democratic, helped ensure his defeat in the Midwest. According to Stanley Jones, "the only conclusion to be reached was that the Bryan campaign, with its emphasis on the free coinage of silver at 16 to 1, had not appealed to the urban working classes."

On November 5, Bryan sent a telegram of congratulations to McKinley, becoming the first losing presidential candidate to do so, "Senator Jones has just informed me that the returns indicate your election, and I hasten to extend my congratulations. We have submitted the issues to the American people and their will is law." By the end of 1896, Bryan had published his account of the campaign, The First Battle. In the book, Bryan made it clear that the first battle would not be the last, "If we are right, we shall yet triumph."

== Appraisal and legacy ==
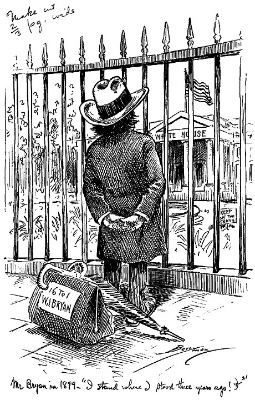
Cartoon of Bryan gazing through the White House fence

Michael Kazin, Bryan's biographer, notes the many handicaps he faced in his 1896 campaign: "A severe economic downturn that occurred with Democrats in power, a party deserted by its men of wealth and national prominence, the vehement opposition of most prominent publishers and academics and ministers, and hostility from the nation's largest employers". According to Kazin, "what is remarkable is not that Bryan lost but that he came as close as he did to winning." Williams believes that Bryan did better than any other Democrat would have, and comments, "The nominee of a divided and discredited party, he had come remarkably close to winning." Bryan's own explanation was brief: "I have borne the sins of Grover Cleveland."

The consequences of defeat, however, were severe for the Democratic Party. The 1896 presidential race is generally considered a realigning election, when there is a major shift in voting patterns, upsetting the political balance. McKinley was supported by middle-class and wealthy voters, urban laborers, and prosperous farmers; this coalition would keep the Republicans mostly in power until the 1930s. The election of 1896 marked a transition as the concerns of the rural population became secondary to those of the urban; according to Stanley Jones, "the Democratic Party reacted with less sensitivity than the Republicans to the hopes and fears of the new voters which the new age was producing". This was evidenced in the tariff question: Bryan spent little time addressing it, stating that it was subsumed in the financial issue; Republican arguments that the protective tariff would benefit manufacturers appealed to urban workers and went unrebutted by the Democrats.

One legacy of the campaign was the career of William Jennings Bryan. He ran for president a second time in 1900 and a third time in 1908, each time losing. Through the almost three decades before his death in 1925, he was ever present on political platform and speaking circuit, fighting first for silver, and then for other causes. Bryan served as Secretary of State under President Woodrow Wilson from 1913 to 1915, resigning as Wilson moved the nation closer to intervention in World War I. His final years were marked with controversy, such as his involvement in the Scopes Monkey Trial in the final weeks of his life, but according to Kazin, "Bryan's sincerity, warmth, and passion for a better world won the hearts of people who cared for no other public figure in his day".

Despite his defeat, Bryan's campaign inspired many of his contemporaries. Writers such as Edgar Lee Masters, Hamlin Garland and his fellow Nebraskan, Willa Cather, like Bryan came from the prairies; they wrote of their admiration for him and his first battle. The poet Vachel Lindsay, 16 years old in 1896, passionately followed Bryan's first campaign, and wrote of him many years later:

Where is that boy, that Heaven-born Bryan,
That Homer Bryan, who sang from the West?
Gone to join the shadows with Altgeld the Eagle,
Where the kings and the slaves and the troubadours rest.

== Results ==
Electoral results
| Presidential candidate | Party | Home state | Popular vote | | Electoral vote | Running mate | | |
| Presidential candidate | Party | Home state | Count | Percentage | Electoral vote | Vice-presidential candidate | Home state | Electoral vote |
|---|---|---|---|---|---|---|---|---|
| William McKinley | Republican | Ohio | 7,102,246 | 51.0% | 271 | Garret A. Hobart | New Jersey | 271 |
| William Jennings Bryan | Democratic/ Populist | Nebraska | 6,492,559 | 46.7% | 176 | Arthur Sewall (Note: Sewall was Bryan's Democratic running mate.) | Maine | 149 |
| William Jennings Bryan | Democratic/ Populist | Nebraska | 6,492,559 | 46.7% | 176 | Thomas E. Watson (Note: Watson was Bryan's Populist running mate.) | Georgia | 27 |
| John M. Palmer | National Democratic | Illinois | 133,537 | 0.96% | 0 | Simon Bolivar Buckner | Kentucky | 0 |
| Joshua Levering | Prohibition | Maryland | 124,896 | 0.90% | 0 | Hale Johnson | Illinois | 0 |
| Charles Matchett | Socialist Labor | New York | 36,359 | 0.26% | 0 | Matthew Maguire | New Jersey | 0 |
| Charles Eugene Bentley | National Prohibition | Nebraska | 19,367 | 0.14% | 0 | James Southgate | North Carolina | 0 |
| Other | | | 1,570 | 0.0% | — | Other | | — |
| Total | | | 13,905,691 | 100% | 447 | | | 447 |
| Needed to win | | | | | 224 | | | 224 |

Source (Popular Vote): Leip, David. "1896 Presidential Election Results". Dave Leip's Atlas of U.S. Presidential Elections.
Source (Electoral Vote): "Electoral College Box Scores 1789–1996". National Archives and Records Administration.

== Notes and references ==
=== References ===
==== Bibliography ====
===== Books =====
- Bensel, Richard Franklin (2008). Passion and Preferences: William Jennings Bryan and the 1896 Democratic National Convention. Cambridge, UK: Cambridge University Press. ISBN 978-0-521-71762-5.
- Bryan, William Jennings (1896). The First Battle: A Story of the Campaign of 1896. Chicago: W.B. Conkey Company.
- Cherny, Robert W. (1985). A Righteous Cause: The Life of William Jennings Bryan. Boston: Little, Brown, and Company. ISBN 978-0-316-13854-3.
- Coletta, Paulo E. (1964). William Jennings Bryan: Political Evangelist, 1860–1908. Lincoln, Neb.: University of Nebraska Press. ISBN 978-0-8032-0022-7.
- Dickinson, Edward B. (official stenographer) (1896). Official Proceedings of the Democratic National Convention. Logansport, Ind.: Wilson, Humphreys, and Co.
- Harpine, William D. (2005). From the Front Porch to the Front Page: McKinley and Bryan in the 1896 Presidential Campaign. Presidential Rhetoric. Vol. 13. College Station, Tex.: Texas A&M University Press. ISBN 978-1-58544-559-2.
- Hofstadter, Richard (1979). "Free Silver and the Mind of "Coin" Harvey". The Paranoid Style in American Politics, and Other Essays. University of Chicago Press. ISBN 978-0-226-34817-9.
- Horner, William T. (2010). Ohio's Kingmaker: Mark Hanna, Man and Myth. Athens, Ohio: Ohio University Press. ISBN 978-0-8214-1894-9.
- Jones, Stanley L. (1964). The Presidential Election of 1896. Madison, Wis.: University of Wisconsin Press. OCLC 445683.
- Kazin, Michael (2006). A Godly Hero: The Life of William Jennings Bryan. New York: Alfred A. Knopf. ISBN 978-0-375-41135-9.
- Koenig, Louis W. (1971). Bryan. New York: G.P. Putnam's Sons. ISBN 978-0-399-10104-5.
- Kohn, Edward P. (2010). Hot Time in the Old Town: The Great Heat Wave of 1896 and the Making of Theodore Roosevelt. New York City: Basic Books. ISBN 978-0-465-01336-4.
- Morgan, H. Wayne (1969). From Hayes to McKinley: National Party Politics, 1877–1896. Syracuse, N.Y.: Syracuse University Press. ISBN 978-0-8156-2136-2.
- Morgan, H. Wayne (2003). William McKinley and His America (revised ed.). Kent, Ohio: The Kent State University Press. ISBN 978-0-87338-765-1.
- Phillips, Kevin (2003). William McKinley. New York: Henry Holt and Company. ISBN 978-0-8050-6953-2.
- Williams, R. Hal (2010). Realigning America: McKinley, Bryan and the Remarkable Election of 1896. Lawrence, Kan.: University Press of Kansas. ISBN 978-0-7006-1721-0.

===== Articles and other sources =====
- Barnes, James A. (December 1947). "Myths of the Bryan campaign". The Mississippi Valley Historical Review. 34 (3). Lincoln, Neb.: Mississippi Valley Historical Society: 367–404. doi:10.2307/1898096. JSTOR 1898096.
- Diamond, William (January 1941). "Urban and Rural Voting in 1896". American Historical Review. 46 (2). Washington, D.C.: American Historical Association: 281–305. doi:10.2307/1838945. JSTOR 1838945.
