= Michael N. Dobkowski =

American academic and professor

Michael N. Dobkowski is an American academic and professor who focuses on Jewish history and religion. He has been a faculty member of Hobart and William Smith Colleges since 1976. In 2021, he was named the John Milton Potter Chair in the Humanities.

== Select publications ==
- Dobkowski, Michael N. (1979). The tarnished dream: the basis of American anti-Semitism. Contributions in American history ; no. 81. Westport, Conn: Greenwood Press. ISBN 978-0-313-20641-2.
- Dobkowski, Michael N. (1986). Jewish American Voluntary Organizations. Greenwood
- Dobkowski, Michael N.; Wallimann, Isidor, eds. (1989). Radical perspectives on the rise of Fascism in Germany, 1919-1945. New York: Monthly Review Press. ISBN 978-0-85345-757-2.
- Dobkowski, Michael N.; Wallimann, Isidor (1992). Genocide in our time: an annotated bibliography with analytical introductions. Resources on contemporary issues. Ann Arbor, Mich: Pierian Press. ISBN 978-0-87650-280-8.
- Dobkowski, Michael N.; Lovenheim, Barbara (1998). A family among families: the Jewish Home of Rochester since 1920 (1 ed.). Rochester, N.Y: Jewish Home Foundation. ISBN 978-0-9651374-1-6.
