= Cross of Gold speech =

1896 speech by William Jennings Bryan

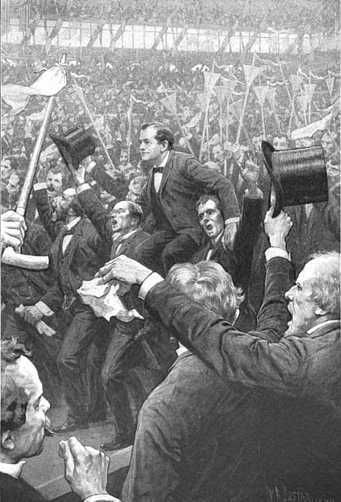
- William Jennings Bryan being carried on the shoulders of delegates after giving the speech
- Date: July 9, 1896; 130 years ago
- Time: 2:00 pm
- Duration: 35 minutes (scheduled)
- Venue: Chicago Coliseum
- Location: Chicago, Illinois, United States
- Theme: Bimetallism
- Participants: William Jennings Bryan
- Outcome: Bryan nominated for president by the Democrats
- Occurred at: 1896 Democratic National Convention, third day, party platform debate
- Possible recording of the original speech Also attributed to an 1892 speech by President Grover Cleveland; Recorded July 1896 (if authentic) Audio excerpt of the speech later recorded by William Jennings Bryan A reenactment of the speech by Bryan; Recorded 1921

The Cross of Gold speech was delivered by William Jennings Bryan, a former United States Representative from Nebraska, at the Democratic National Convention in Chicago on July 9, 1896. In his address, Bryan supported "free silver" (i.e. bimetallism), which he believed would bring the nation prosperity. He decried the gold standard, famously concluding the speech, "you shall not crucify mankind upon a cross of gold". Bryan's address helped catapult him to the Democratic Party's presidential nomination and is considered one of the greatest political speeches in American history.

For twenty years, Americans had been bitterly divided over the nation's monetary standard. The gold standard, which the United States had effectively been on since 1873, limited the money supply but eased trade with other nations, such as the United Kingdom, whose currency was also based on gold. Many Americans, however, believed that bimetallism (making both gold and silver legal tender) was necessary for the nation's economic health. The financial Panic of 1893 intensified the debates, and when President Grover Cleveland (a Democrat) continued to support the gold standard against the will of much of his party, activists became determined to take over the Democratic Party organization and nominate a silver-supporting candidate in 1896.

Bryan had been a dark horse candidate with little support in the convention and was barely known outside of his home state of Nebraska. His speech, delivered at the close of the debate on the party platform, electrified the convention and is generally credited with earning him the nomination for president. However, he lost the general election to William McKinley. The United States formally adopted the gold standard less than four years later in 1900 with the signing of the Gold Standard Act, retaining it domestically until 1933 and internationally until 1971.

== Background ==
=== Monetary standards and the United States ===
In January 1791, at the request of Congress, Secretary of the Treasury Alexander Hamilton issued a report on the currency. At the time, there was no mint in the United States; foreign coins were used. Hamilton proposed a monetary system based on bimetallism, in which the new currency would be equal to a given amount of gold, or a larger amount of silver; at the time a given weight of gold was worth about 15 times as much as the same amount of silver. Although Hamilton understood that adjustment might be needed from time to time as precious metal prices fluctuated, he believed that if the nation's unit of value were defined only by one of the two precious metals used for coins, the other would descend to the status of mere merchandise, unusable as a store of value. He also proposed the establishment of a mint, at which citizens could present gold or silver, and receive it back, struck into money. On April 2, 1792, Congress passed the Mint Act of 1792. This legislation defined a unit of value for the new nation, to be known as a dollar. The new unit of currency was defined to be equal to 24.75 grains (1.604 g) of gold, or alternatively, 371.25 grains (24.057 g) of silver, establishing a ratio of value between gold and silver of 15:1. The legislation also established the Mint of the United States.

In the early 19th century, the economic disruption caused by the Napoleonic Wars caused United States gold coins to be worth more as bullion than as money, and they vanished from circulation. Governmental response to this shortage was hampered by the fact that officials did not clearly understand what had happened. In 1830, Treasury Secretary Samuel D. Ingham proposed adjusting the ratio between gold and silver in US currency to 15.8:1, which had for some time been the ratio in Europe. It was not until 1834 that Congress acted, changing the gold/silver ratio to 16.002:1. This was close enough to the market value to make it uneconomic to export either US gold or silver coins. When silver prices rose relative to gold as a reaction to the California Gold Rush, silver coinage was worth more than face value, and rapidly flowed overseas for melting. Despite vocal opposition led by Tennessee Representative (and future president) Andrew Johnson, the precious metal content of smaller silver coins was reduced in 1853. Silver was now undervalued at the Mint; accordingly little was presented for striking into money.

The Coinage Act of 1873 eliminated the standard silver dollar. It also repealed the statutory provisions allowing silver bullion to be presented to the Mint and returned in the form of circulating money. In passing the Coinage Act, Congress eliminated bimetallism. During the economic chaos of the Panic of 1873, the price of silver dropped significantly, but the Mint would accept none for striking into legal tender. Silver producers complained, and many Americans came to believe that only through bimetallism could the nation achieve and maintain prosperity. They called for the return to pre-1873 laws, which would require the Mint to take all the silver offered it and return it, struck into silver dollars. This would inflate the money supply, and, adherents argued, increase the nation's prosperity. Critics contended that the inflation which would follow the introduction of such a policy would harm workers, whose wages would not rise as fast as prices would, and the operation of Gresham's law would drive gold from circulation, effectively placing the United States on a silver standard.

=== Early attempts toward free silver ===
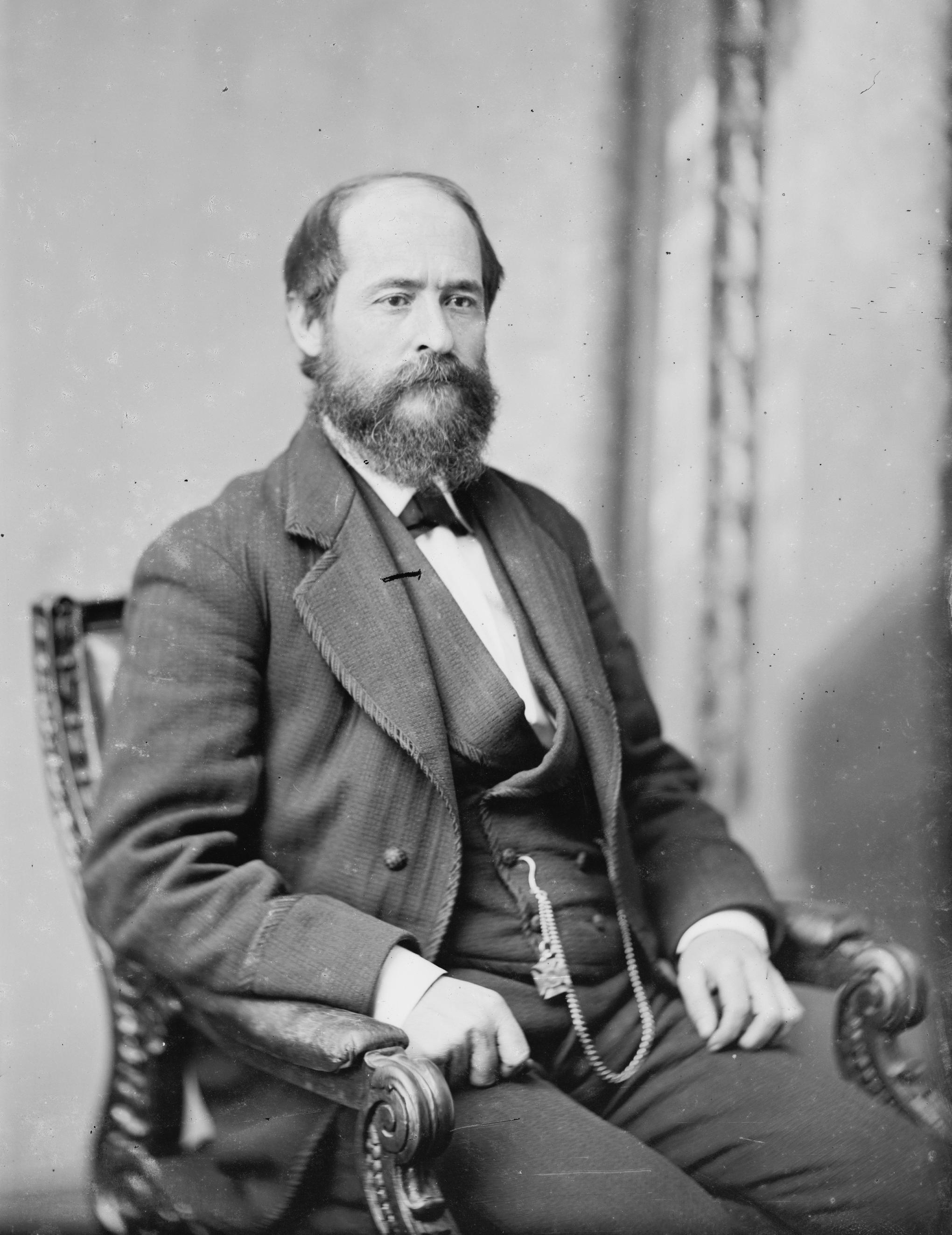
Representative Richard P. Bland

To advocates of what became known as free silver, the 1873 act became known as the "Crime of '73". Pro-silver forces, with congressional leaders such as Missouri Representative Richard P. Bland, sought the passage of bills to allow depositors of silver bullion to receive it back in the form of coin. Such bills, sponsored by Bland, passed the House of Representatives in 1876 and 1877, but both times failed in the Senate. A third attempt in early 1878 again passed the House, and eventually both houses after being amended in the Senate. The bill, as modified by amendments sponsored by Iowa Senator William B. Allison, did not reverse the 1873 provisions, but required the Treasury to purchase a minimum of $2 million of silver bullion per month; the profit, or seignorage from monetizing the silver was to be used to purchase more silver bullion. The silver would be struck into dollar coins to be circulated, or else stored and used as backing for silver certificates. The Bland–Allison Act was vetoed by President Rutherford B. Hayes, but was enacted by Congress over his veto on February 28, 1878.

Implementation of the Bland–Allison Act did not end calls for free silver. The 1880s saw a steep decline in the prices of grain and other agricultural commodities. Silver advocates argued that this dropoff, which caused the price of grain to fall below its cost of production, was caused by the failure of the government to adequately increase the money supply, which had remained steady on a per capita basis. Advocates of the gold standard attributed the decline to advances in production and transportation. The late 19th century saw divergent views in economics as the laissez-faire orthodoxy was questioned by younger economists, and both sides found ample support for their views from theorists.

In 1890, the Sherman Silver Purchase Act greatly increased government purchases of silver. The government pledged to stand behind the silver dollars and treasury notes issued under the act by redeeming them in gold. Pursuant to this promise, government gold reserves dwindled over the following three years. Although the economic Panic of 1893 had a number of causes, President Grover Cleveland believed the inflation caused by Sherman's act to be a major factor, and called a special session of Congress to repeal it. Congress did so, but the debates showed bitter divides in both major parties between silver and gold factions. Cleveland tried to replenish the Treasury through issuance of bonds which could only be purchased with gold, with little effect but to increase the public debt, as the gold continued to be withdrawn in redemption for paper and silver currency. Many in the public saw the bonds as benefiting bankers, not the nation. The bankers did not want loans repaid in an inflated currency—the gold standard was deflationary, and as creditors, they preferred to be paid in such a currency, whereas debtors preferred to repay in inflated currency.

The effects of the depression which began in 1893, and which continued through 1896, ruined many Americans. Contemporary estimates were an unemployment rate as high as 25%. The task of relieving the jobless fell to churches and other charities, as well as to labor unions. Farmers went bankrupt; their farms were sold to pay their debts. Some of the impoverished died of disease or starvation; others killed themselves.

=== Bryan seeks the nomination ===
Among those who spoke against the repeal of the Sherman Silver Purchase Act was Nebraska Representative William Jennings Bryan. Known as an orator even then ("the Boy Orator of the Platte"), Bryan had not always favored free silver out of conviction, stating in 1892 that he was for it because the people of Nebraska were for it. By 1893, his views on silver had evolved, and on the floor of the House of Representatives, he delivered a riveting three-hour address against repeal of the Silver Purchase Act. In his conclusion, Bryan reached back in history:

When a crisis like the present arose and the national bank of his day sought to control the politics of the nation, God raised up an Andrew Jackson, who had the courage to grapple with that great enemy, and by overthrowing it, he made himself the idol of the people and reinstated the Democratic party in public confidence. What will the decision be today? The Democratic party has won the greatest success in its history. Standing upon this victory-crowned summit, will it turn its face to the rising or the setting sun? Will it choose blessings or cursings—life or death—which? Which?

Despite the repeal of the act, economic conditions failed to improve. The year 1894 saw considerable labor unrest. President Cleveland sent federal troops to Illinois to end the Pullman Strike—workers at the Pullman Palace Car Company, which made railroad cars, had struck after wages were cut. Railway employees had refused to handle Pullman cars in sympathy with the strikers; this action threatened to paralyze the nation's rail lines. The President's move was opposed by the Democratic Governor of Illinois, John Altgeld. Angered by Cleveland's actions in the labor dispute, and by his uncompromising stand against silver, Altgeld began to organize Democrats against Cleveland's renomination in 1896. Although Altgeld and his adherents urged voters to distinguish between Cleveland and his party, the Democrats lost 113 seats in the House in the 1894 midterm elections, the greatest loss by a majority party in congressional history. The Republicans gained control of the House, as well as the Senate, which until 1913 was elected by the state legislatures rather than by the popular vote. Among those defeated for Senate was Bryan in Nebraska.

Bryan had long planned to run for president. Although he would only be 36 years old in 1896—one year above the constitutional minimum—he believed the silver question could carry him not only to the nomination, but to the presidency. He traveled widely, speaking to audiences across the nation. His speeches impressed many; even some of his opponents later conceded that Bryan was the most compelling speaker they had ever heard. Bryan's speeches evolved over time; in December 1894, in a speech in Congress, he first used a phrase from which would come the conclusion to his most famous address: as originally stated, it was "I will not help to crucify mankind upon a cross of gold."

A myth has arisen that Bryan was an unknown prior to 1896. This was not the case; Bryan was well known as an orator on the tariff and silver questions. Albert Shaw, editor of The Review of Reviews, stated that after Bryan's nomination, many easterners professed not to have heard of him but: "If, indeed, they had not heard of Mr. Bryan before, they had failed to follow closely the course of American politics in the past eight years. As a Democratic member of the Ways and Means Committee through two Congresses, Mr. Bryan was by all odds the ablest and strongest orator on the Democratic side of the House. His subsequent canvass [campaign] for the United States senatorship in Nebraska was noteworthy and conspicuous on many accounts."

In the aftermath of the 1894 election, the silver forces, led by Altgeld and others, began an attempt to take over the machinery of the Democratic Party. Historian Stanley Jones, in his study of the 1896 election, suggests that western Democrats would have opposed Cleveland even if the party had held its congressional majority in 1894; with the disastrous defeat, they believed the party would be wiped out in the West if it did not support silver. Bryan biographer Paolo E. Coletta wrote, "during this year [July 1894 – June 1895] of calamities, disintegration and revolution, each crisis aided Bryan because it caused division within his party and permitted him to contest for its mastery as it slipped from Cleveland's fingers."

In early 1896, with the economy still poor, there was widespread discontent with the two existing major political parties. Some people, for the most part Democrats, joined the far-left Populist Party. Many Republicans in the western states, dismayed by the strong allegiance of eastern Republicans to the gold standard, considered forming their own party. When the Republicans in June 1896 nominated former Ohio Governor William McKinley for president and passed at his request a platform strongly supporting "sound money" (the gold standard unless modified by international agreement), a number of "Silver Republicans" walked out of the convention. The leader of those who left was Colorado Senator Henry M. Teller; he was immediately spoken of as a possible candidate for the Democratic nomination.

Bryan believed that he could, if nominated, unite the disaffected behind a strong silver campaign. However, part of his strategy was to remain inconspicuous until the last possible moment at the convention. He sent letters to national convention delegates, urging them to support silver, and enclosing copies of his photograph, writings, and speeches. Jones points out that though Bryan's speaking engagements were not deemed political by the standards of 1896, by modern measurements he was far more active in campaigning for the nomination than most of the better-known candidates.

Historian James A. Barnes, in his historical journal article pointing out myths that have arisen about Bryan's candidacy and campaign, stated that Bryan's efforts bore fruit even before the convention:

By April, 1896, many individuals were quietly working for Bryan's nomination. Circulars were being distributed in Illinois, and admirers in Nebraska, North Carolina, Mississippi, Louisiana, Texas, Arkansas, and other states were urging his selection among their friends. It was not in any concerted or open action, however, that Bryan had his strength; it was in the friendly predisposition of the mass of the delegates that he had hopes.

=== Selection of delegates ===
The 1896 Democratic National Convention followed events unique in post-Civil War American history. One after another, state conventions to elect delegates to the national convention in Chicago repudiated an incumbent elected president of their party, who had not declared whether he would be a candidate for renomination. According to Barnes:

The people of the South and the West had for years been convinced of the enormity of the "crime of 1873", and they had long since come to regard silver as the sword that would cut the Gordian knot of privilege. Consciousness of grievances of years and not of months was reflected in the decisive action of the state Democratic conventions in the spring and early summer of 1896.

Many state conventions elected delegates pledged to support bimetallism in the party platform. Gold Democrats were successful in a few states in the Northeast, but had little luck elsewhere. Speakers in some states cursed Cleveland; the South Carolina convention denounced him. Cleveland issued a statement urging Democratic voters to support gold—the next convention to be held, in Illinois, unanimously supported silver; the keynote speaker prayed for divine forgiveness for Cleveland's 1892 nomination. Gold and silver factions in some states, such as Bryan's Nebraska, sent rival delegations to the convention.

== 1896 convention ==
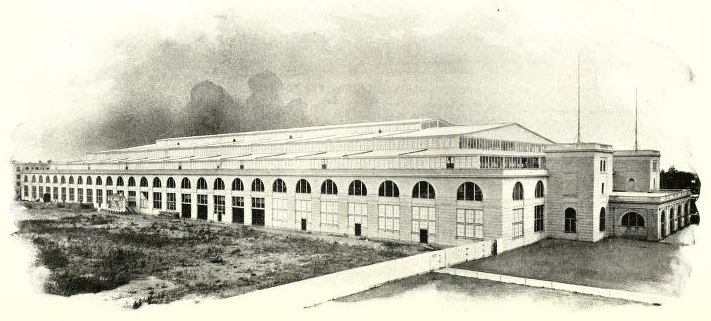
The Chicago Coliseum

The 1896 Democratic convention opened at the Chicago Coliseum on July 7, 1896. Much activity took place in advance of the formal opening as the silver and (vastly outnumbered) gold forces prepared their strategies. Silver forces were supported by the Democratic National Bimetallic Committee, the umbrella group formed in 1895 to support silver Democrats in their insurgency against Cleveland. Gold Democrats looked to the President for leadership, but Cleveland, trusting few in his party, did not involve himself further in the gold efforts, but spent the week of the convention fishing off the New Jersey coast.

The Bimetallic Committee carefully planned to take control of every aspect of the convention, eliminating any threat that the minority gold faction could take power. It made no secret of these preparations. This takeover was considered far more important than was the choice of presidential candidate, and the committee decided to take no position on who should win the race for the nomination, reasoning that the victor, no matter who he was, would be a silver man. Well aware of the overwhelming forces against them, many gold delegates were inclined to concede the platform battle.

Bryan arrived quietly and took rooms at a modest hotel; the Nebraskan later calculated that he spent less than $100 while in Chicago. He arrived convinced that he would win the nomination. He had already begun work on a speech. On the evening of July 5, Bryan was visited by a delegation of Coloradans, seeking his support for Senator Teller. They went away apologetically, not having known Bryan sought the nomination.

=== Candidates for the nomination ===
Despite the desire of silver delegates to nominate a candidate who shared their beliefs, and although several states instructed their delegates to vote for a specific candidate, there was no overwhelming favorite for the nomination going into the convention. With a two-thirds vote of the delegates needed to nominate, almost every silver delegate would have to vote for the same candidate to assure success, though any organized support from gold delegates would greatly damage a silver candidate's chances.

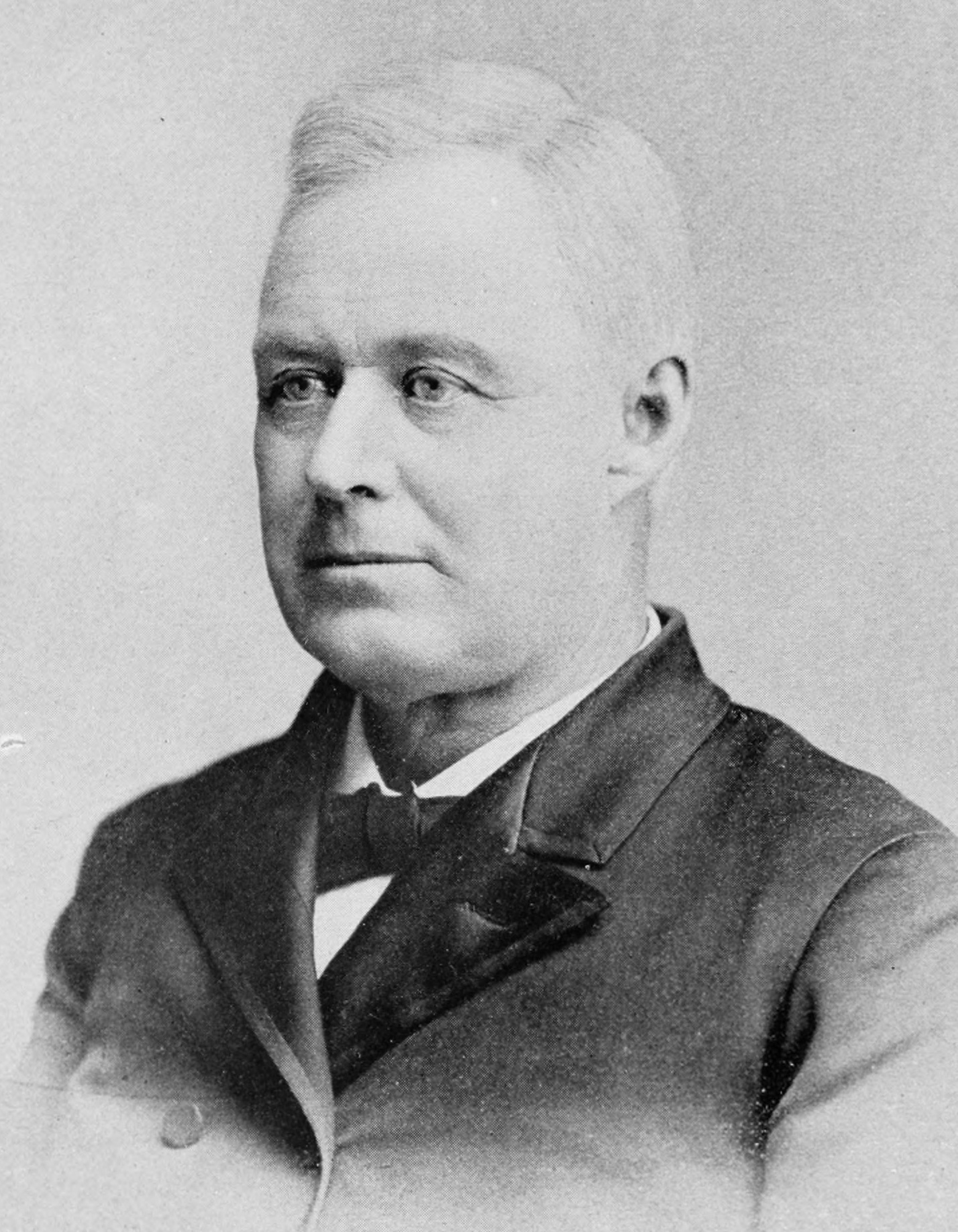
Former Iowa Governor Horace Boies was a major contender for the Democratic nomination for president in 1896.

The only gold man who put together any sort of campaign for the Democratic nomination was Treasury Secretary John G. Carlisle, but he withdrew in April, stating that he was more concerned about the platform of the party than who would lead it. However, as late as June, the gold forces, which still controlled the Democratic National Committee (DNC), continued to believe that the nominee could be pro-gold. Cleveland friend and former Postmaster General Donald M. Dickinson wrote to the President in June 1896 hoping that the delegates would recognize "common sense" and be frightened at the thought of nominating a radical.

One of the leaders of the silver movement was Illinois Governor Altgeld; a native of Germany, he was constitutionally barred from the presidency by his foreign birth. Going into the convention, the two leading candidates for the nomination were former Congressman Bland, who had originated the Bland-Allison Act, and former Iowa Governor Horace Boies, with Bland considered the frontrunner. These were the only two candidates to put together organizations to try to secure delegate votes, though both efforts were cash-starved. Both men had electoral problems: Bland at age 61 was seen by some as a man whose time had passed; Boies was a former Republican who had once decried bimetallism. There were a large number of potential candidates seen as having less support; these included Vice President Adlai Stevenson of Illinois, Senator Joseph C. Blackburn of Kentucky, Senator Teller, and Bryan.

=== Silver advocates take control ===
Although Bryan had decided on a strategy to gain the nomination—to give a speech which would make him the logical candidate in the eyes of delegates—he faced obstacles along the way. For one thing, he began the 1896 convention without any official status—the Democratic National Committee, which made the initial determination of which delegations would be seated, had chosen the pro-gold Nebraskans to represent their state. Bryan had been waiting outside the committee room when his rivals were seated by a 27–23 vote; contemporary accounts state he was "somewhat surprised" at the result. The DNC's action could be reversed, but not until the convention's credentials committee reported. However, Barnes deemed the actions by the committee immaterial to the outcome due to the silver strength in the convention:

Anyone who doubts the power the silverites were ready to unleash in a disciplined and irresistible attack needs only to read the results of the election of temporary chairman. The gold men, though they possessed the machinery of the party, had neither the power nor the strength to challenge their opponents. They could only beg them to spare the party the humiliation of broken traditions and the overthrowing of established control. Nevertheless, Senator John W. Daniel of Virginia was by an overwhelming vote elected temporary chairman, and a Committee on Credentials was appointed that seated Bryan and his contesting Nebraska delegation.

We demand the free and unlimited coinage of both silver and gold at the present legal ratio of 16 to 1 without waiting for the aid or consent of any other nation. We demand that the standard silver dollar shall be a full legal tender, equally with gold, for all debts, public and private, and we favor such legislation as will prevent for the future the demonitization of any kind of legal tender by private contract.

— From the money plank of the Democratic platform

Good luck favored Bryan—he was considered for various convention roles by the silverites, but each time was not selected. The temporary chairmanship, for example, would have permitted him to deliver the keynote address. However, Bryan, lacking a seat at the start of the convention, could not be elected temporary chairman. Bryan considered this no loss at all; the focus of the convention was on the party platform and the debate which would precede its adoption. The platform would symbolize the repudiation of Cleveland and his policies after the insurgents' long struggle, and Bryan was determined to close the debate on the platform. Bryan, once seated, was Nebraska's representative to the Committee on Resolutions (generally called the "platform committee"), which allocated 80 minutes to each side in the debate and selected Bryan as one of the speakers. South Carolina Senator Benjamin Tillman was to be the other pro-silver speaker, and originally wished to close the debate. However, the senator wanted 50 minutes to speak, too long for a closing address, and at Bryan's request agreed to open the debate instead. Accordingly, Bryan became the final speaker on the platform.

Delegates, as they waited for the committees to complete their work, spent much of the first two days listening to various orators. Of these, only Senator Blackburn, a silver supporter, sparked much reaction, and that only momentary. Delegates called for better-known speakers, such as Altgeld or Bryan, but were granted neither then; the Illinois governor declined, and the Nebraskan, once seated, spent much of his time away from the convention floor at the platform committee meeting at the Palmer House.

The debate on the platform opened at the start of the third day of the convention, July 9, 1896. The session was supposed to begin at 10:00 a.m., but as delegates, slowed by the long commute from the hotels to the Coliseum and fatigue from the first two days, did not arrive on time, proceedings did not begin until 10:45. Nevertheless, large crowds gathered outside the public entrances; the galleries were quickly packed. Once the convention came to order, Arkansas Senator James K. Jones, chair of the Committee on Resolutions, read the proposed platform to cheers by many delegates; the reading of the pro-gold minority report attracted less applause.

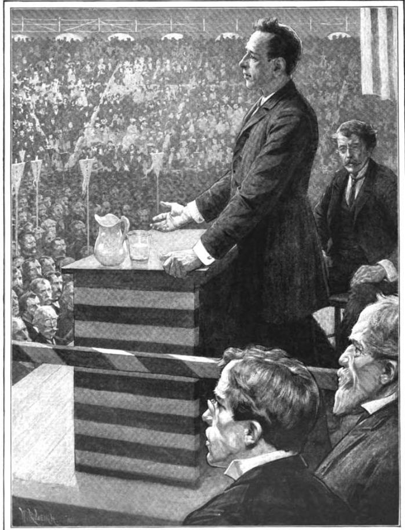
In a 1900 engraving, former Massachusetts Governor William E. Russell is shown preceding Bryan in addressing the convention.

"Pitchfork Ben" Tillman lived up to his nickname with an incendiary address which began with a reference to his home state's role in beginning the Civil War. Although Tillman endorsed silver, his address was so laced with sectionalism that most silver delegates remained silent for fear of being seen as supporting him. Tillman's speech, scheduled to be the only one in support of silver except Bryan's, was so badly received that Senator Jones, who had not planned to speak, gave a brief address asserting that silver was a national issue.

Senator David B. Hill of New York, a gold supporter, was next. As Hill moved to the podium, a reporter friend passed Bryan a note urging him to make a patriotic speech without hint of sectionalism; Bryan responded, "You will not be disappointed." Hill gave a calm speech defending the gold position, and swayed few delegates. He was followed by two other gold men, Senator William Vilas of Wisconsin and former Massachusetts Governor William E. Russell. Vilas gave a lengthy defense of the Cleveland administration's policies, so long that Russell, fearing that Vilas' speech would cut into his time, asked that the time given to the gold proponents be extended by ten minutes. Bryan consented, on condition that his own time was extended by the same amount; this was agreed to. "And I needed it for the speech I was to make." Bryan later wrote, "This was another unexpected bit of good fortune. I had never had such an opportunity before in my life and never expect to have again."

Vilas quickly lost his audience, which did not want to hear Cleveland defended. Russell's address was inaudible to most of the Coliseum; he was ill and died just over a week later. As the gold men spoke, Bryan ate a sandwich to settle his stomach; he was often nervous before major speeches. Another reporter approached him and asked him who he thought would win the nomination. "Strictly confidential, not to be quoted for publication: I will be."

=== Bryan addresses the convention ===
As Russell concluded, to strong applause from gold delegates, there was a buzz of anticipation as Bryan ascended to the podium. There was loud cheering as Bryan stood there, waiting for his audience to calm. Bryan's lecture tours had left him a well-known spokesman for silver. As yet, no one at the convention had effectively spoken for that cause, which was paramount to the delegates. According to political scientist Richard F. Bensel in his study of the 1896 Democratic convention, "Although the silver men knew they would win this fight, they nonetheless needed someone to tell them—and the gold men—why they must enshrine silver at the heart of the platform." Bensel noted, "The pump was more than primed, it was ready to explode." Bryan would say little that he had not said before—the text is similar to that of a speech he had given the previous week at Crete, Nebraska—but he would give the convention its voice.

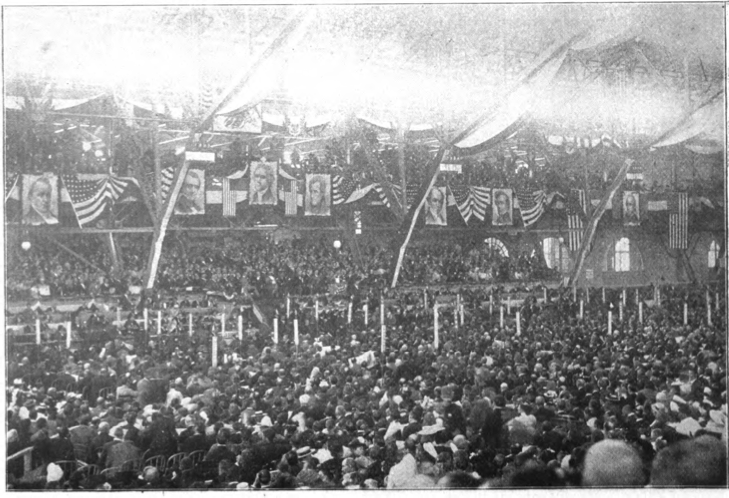
The 1896 Democratic National Convention

Bryan began softly,

I would be presumptuous, indeed, to present myself against the distinguished gentlemen to whom you have listened if this were a mere measuring of abilities; but this is not a contest between persons. The humblest citizen in all the land, when clad in the armor of a righteous cause, is stronger than all the hosts of error. I come to speak to you in defense of a cause as holy as the cause of liberty—the cause of humanity.

Bryan's opening claimed no personal prestige for himself—but nevertheless placed him as the spokesman for silver. According to Bensel, the self-deprecation helped disarm the delegates. As Bryan was not deemed a major contender for the nomination, even delegates committed to a candidate could cheer him without seeming to betray their allegiance. Bryan then recounted the history of the silver movement; the audience, which had loudly demonstrated its approval of his opening statements, quieted. Throughout the speech, Bryan had the delegates in the palm of his hand; they cheered on cue. The Nebraskan later described the audience as like a trained choir. As he concluded his historical recitation, he reminded the silver delegates that they had come to crown their victory, "not to discuss, not to debate, but to enter up the judgment already rendered by the plain people of this country".

Bryan continued with language evoking the Civil War, telling his audience that "in this contest brother has been arrayed against brother, father against son." By then, as he spoke in a sincere tone, his voice sounded clearly and loudly through the hall. He denied, however that the contest was personal; he bore no ill-will towards those who supported the gold standard. However, he stated, facing towards the gold delegates, "when you come before us and tell us that we are about to disturb your business interests, we reply that you have disturbed our business interests by your course." The gold men, during the address, paid close attention and showed their appreciation for Bryan's oratory. Bryan then defended the right of silver supporters to make their argument against opposition from gold men, who were associated with financial interests, especially in the East. Although his statements nominally responded to a point made by Russell, Bryan had thought of the argument the previous evening, and had not used it in earlier speeches. He always regarded it as the best point he made during the speech, and only the ending caused more reaction from his listeners:

We say to you that you have made the definition of a business man too limited in its application. The man who is employed for wages is as much a business man as his employer; the attorney in a country town is as much a business man as the corporation counsel in a great metropolis; the merchant at the cross-roads store is as much a business man as the merchant of New York; the farmer who goes forth in the morning and toils all day, who begins in spring and toils all summer, and who by the application of brain and muscle to the natural resources of the country creates wealth, is as much a business man as the man who goes upon the Board of Trade and bets upon the price of grain; the miners who go down a thousand feet into the earth, or climb two thousand feet upon the cliffs, and bring forth from their hiding places the precious metals to be poured into the channels of trade are as much business men as the few financial magnates who, in a back room, corner the money of the world. We come to speak of this broader class of business men.

Through this passage, Bryan maintained the contrast between the common man and the city-dwelling elite. It was clear to listeners as he worked his way through the comparisons that he would refer to the farmer, and when he did, the hall exploded with sound. His sympathetic comparison contrasted the hardworking farmer with the city businessman, whom Bryan cast as a gambler. The galleries were filled with white as spectators waved handkerchiefs, and it was several minutes before he could continue. The police in the convention hall, not sharing the enthusiasm for silver, were described by the press (some of whose members were caught up in the frenzy) as standing as if they thought the audience was about to turn on them. When Bryan resumed, his comparison of miner with miser again electrified the audience; the uproar prevented him from continuing for several minutes. One farmer in the gallery had been about to leave rather than listen to Bryan, whom he deemed a Populist; he had been persuaded to stay. At Bryan's words, he threw his hat into the air, slapped the empty seat in front of him with his coat, and shouted, "My God! My God! My God!"

Bryan, having established the right of silver supporters to petition, explained why that petition was not to be denied:

It is for these that we speak. We do not come as aggressors. Our war is not a war of conquest; we are fighting in the defense of our homes, our families, and posterity. We have petitioned, and our petitions have been scorned; we have entreated, and our entreaties have been disregarded; we have begged, and they have mocked when our calamity came. We beg no longer; we entreat no more; we petition no more. We defy them!

With this call to action, Bryan abandoned any hint at compromise, and adopted the techniques of the radical, polarizing orator, finding no common ground between silver and gold forces. He then defended the remainder of the platform, though only speaking in general terms. He mocked McKinley, said by some to resemble Napoleon, noting that he was nominated on the anniversary of the Battle of Waterloo. The lengthy passage as he discussed the platform and the Republicans helped calm the audience, ensuring he would be heard as he reached his peroration. But Bryan first wished to tie the silver question to a greater cause:

Upon which side will the Democratic Party fight; upon the side of "the idle holders of idle capital" or upon the side of "the struggling masses"? That is the question which the party must answer first, and then it must be answered by each individual hereafter. The sympathies of the Democratic Party, as shown by the platform, are on the side of the struggling masses, who have ever been the foundation of the Democratic Party.

He faced in the direction of the gold-dominated state delegations:

There are two ideas of government. There are those who believe that, if you will only legislate to make the well-to-do prosperous, their prosperity will leak through on those below. The Democratic idea, however, has been that if you legislate to make the masses prosperous, their prosperity will find its way up through every class which rests upon them. You come to us and tell us that the great cities are in favor of the gold standard; we reply that the great cities rest upon our broad and fertile prairies. Burn down your cities and leave our farms, and your cities will spring up again as if by magic; but destroy our farms and the grass will grow in the streets of every city in the country.

This statement attracted great cheering, and Bryan turned to rhetorically demolish the compromise position on bimetallism—that it should only be accomplished through international agreement:

It is the issue of 1776 over again. Our ancestors, when but three millions in number, had the courage to declare their political independence of every other nation; shall we, their descendants, when we have grown to seventy millions, declare that we are less independent than our forefathers? No, my friends, that will never be the verdict of our people. Therefore, we care not upon what lines the battle is fought. If they say bimetallism is good, but that we cannot have it until other nations help us, we reply that, instead of having a gold standard because England has, we will restore bimetallism, and then let England have bimetallism because the United States has it. If they dare to come out in the open field and defend the gold standard as a good thing, we will fight them to the uttermost.

Now, Bryan was ready to conclude the speech, and according to his biographer, Michael Kazin, step "into the headlines of American history".

Having behind us the producing masses of this nation and the world, supported by the commercial interests, the laboring interests, and the toilers everywhere, we will answer their demand for a gold standard by saying to them: "You shall not press down upon the brow of labor this crown of thorns; you shall not crucify mankind upon a cross of gold."

As Bryan spoke his final sentence, recalling the Crucifixion of Jesus, he placed his hands to his temples, fingers extended; with the final words, he extended his arms to his sides straight out to his body and held that pose for about five seconds as if offering himself as sacrifice for the cause, as the audience watched in dead silence. He then lowered them, descended from the podium, and began to head back to his seat as the stillness held.

== Reception and nomination ==
=== Convention events ===
Bryan later described the silence as "really painful" and momentarily thought he had failed. As he moved towards his seat, the Coliseum burst into pandemonium. Delegates threw hats, coats, and handkerchiefs into the air. Others took up the standards with the state names on them with each delegation, and planted them by Nebraska's. Two alert police officers had joined Bryan as he left the podium, anticipating the crush. The policemen were swept away by the flood of delegates, who raised Bryan to their shoulders and carried him around the floor. The Washington Post newspaper recorded, "bedlam broke loose, delirium reigned supreme."

It took about 25 minutes to restore order, and according to Bensel, "somewhere in the mass demonstration that was convulsing the convention hall, the transfer of sentiment from silver as a policy to Bryan as a presidential candidate took place". Newspaper accounts of the convention leave little doubt but that, had a vote been taken at that moment (as many were shouting to do), Bryan would have been nominated. Bryan was urged by Senator Jones to allow it, but refused, stating that if his boom would not last overnight, it would never last until November. He soon retired from the convention, returning to his hotel to await the outcome. The convention passed the platform in Bryan's absence and recessed.

The balloting began the following morning, July 10, with a two-thirds vote necessary to nominate. Bryan, who remained at his hotel, sent word to the Nebraska delegation to make no deals on his behalf. He stood second out of fourteen candidates in the first ballot, behind Bland. On the second ballot, Bryan still stood second, but had gained as other candidates had fallen away. The third ballot saw Bland still in the lead, but Bryan took the lead on the fourth ballot. According to Jones, it was clear that Bland could not win, and that Bryan could not be stopped. On the fifth ballot, the Illinois delegation, led by Governor Altgeld, switched its votes from Bland to Bryan. Other delegations, seeing that Bryan would be nominated, also switched, securing the victory. Nevertheless, he won the nomination without the votes of the gold delegates, most of whom either left the convention or refused to vote.

=== Press reaction ===
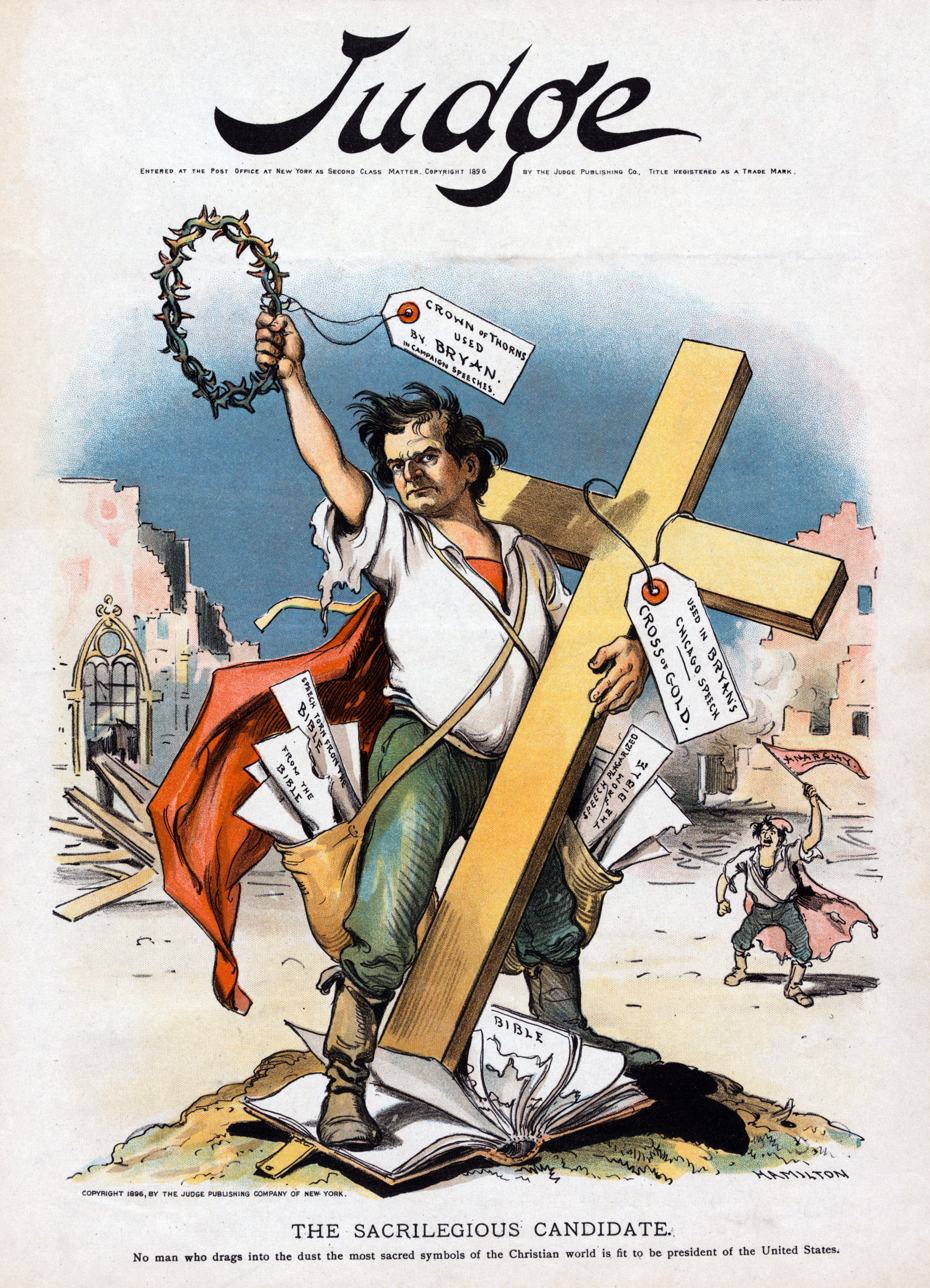
Judge magazine criticized Bryan for sacrilege in his speech. He is shown with crown and cross, but trampling the Bible.

Most contemporary press accounts attributed Bryan's nomination to his eloquence, though in the case of Republican and other gold-favoring newspapers, they considered it his demagoguery. The pro-silver Cleveland Plain Dealer called Bryan's speech "an eloquent, stirring, and manly appeal". The Chicago Tribune reported that Bryan had lit the spark "which touched off the trail of gun-powder". The St. Louis Post-Dispatch opined that with the speech, Bryan "just about immortalized himself".

According to the New York World, "Lunacy having dictated the platform, it was perhaps natural that hysteria should evolve the candidate." The New York Times disparaged Bryan as "the gifted blatherskite from Nebraska". The only paper to predict, after Bryan gave his speech, that he would not be nominated was The Wall Street Journal, which stated, "Bryan has had his day". The Akron Journal and Republican, no friend to Bryan, opined that "never probably has a national convention been swayed or influenced by a single speech as was the national Democratic convention".

=== Anti-Semitism controversy ===
Biographer Paolo E. Coletta wrote that after the speech, an anti-Semitic chant was heard from some of the delegates: "Down with the hooked-nosed Shylocks of Wall Street! Down with the Christ-killing gold bugs!" This quote, noted by many later commentators, is traced to a profile of famous German anti-Semite Hermann Ahlwardt (who had endorsed Bryan) in The Sun. Author James Ledbetter notes various circumstances that suggest this quote may be fiction or parody, and points out the level of anti-Semitic sentiment in the Populist movement is disputed by historians. The newspaper supported McKinley and the gold standard, the story was published anonymously two months after the speech, and it is unclear the author of the piece attended the speech. The quote was mentioned offhandedly and not reported in news accounts from the time of the convention.

== Campaign and aftermath ==
The Pullman Company offered Bryan a private car for his trip home; he declined, not wishing to accept corporate favors. As he traveled by rail to Lincoln, he saw farmers and others standing by the tracks, hoping for a glimpse of the new Democratic nominee. He received many letters from supporters, expressing their faith in him in stark terms. One Indiana voter wrote, "God has sent you amongst our people to save the poor from starvation, and we no [sic] you will save us." A farmer in Iowa, in a letter to Bryan, stated, "You are the first big man that i [sic] ever wrote to."

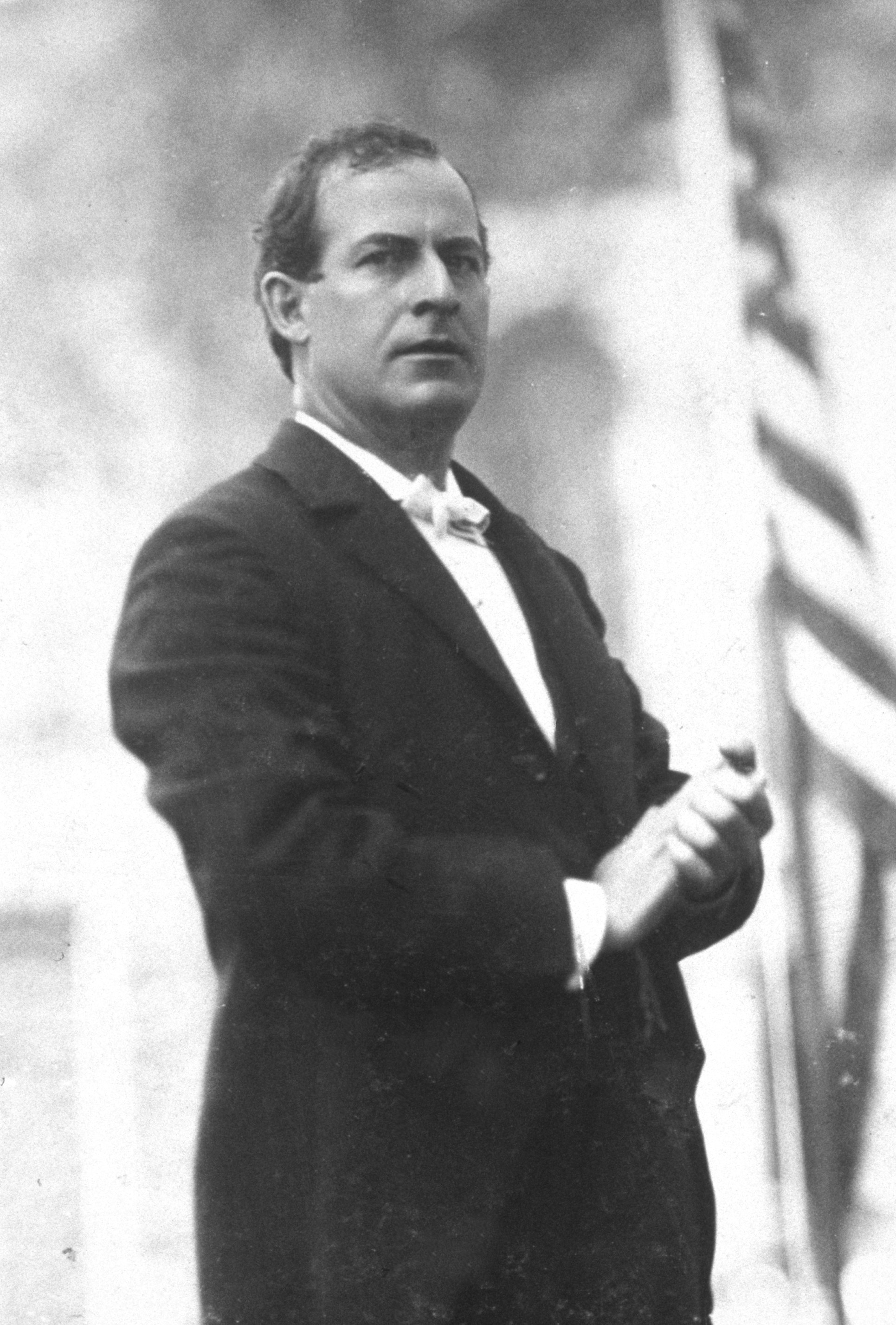
Bryan campaigning on stage a few months after the speech

When McKinley heard that Bryan was likely to be the nominee, he called the report "rot" and hung up the phone. The Republican nominee was slow to realize the surge of support for Bryan after the nomination, stating his view that the silver sentiment would be gone in a month. When McKinley and his advisers, such as industrialist and future senator Mark Hanna, realized that the views were more than transitory, they began intensive fundraising from corporations and the wealthy. The money went for speakers, pamphlets, and other means of conveying their "sound money" campaign to the voter. With far less money than McKinley, Bryan embarked on a nationwide campaign tour by train on a then-unprecedented scale. McKinley on the other hand, opted for a front porch campaign. Both men spoke to hundreds of thousands of people from their chosen venues.

Bryan's nomination divided the party. The dissidents nominated their own ticket; the split in the vote would contribute to Bryan's defeat. However, Bryan did gain the support of the Populists, as well as a convention of Silver Republicans. Bryan spoke on silver throughout the campaign; he rarely addressed other issues. Bryan won the South and most of the West, but McKinley's victories in the more populous Northeast and Midwest carried him to the presidency. The Democratic candidate failed to gain a majority of the labor vote; McKinley won in working-class areas as well as wealthy precincts. Although McKinley outpolled him by 600,000 votes, Bryan received more votes than any previous presidential candidate.

After McKinley's inauguration in March 1897, increases in gold availability from new discoveries and improved refining methods led to a considerable increase in the money supply. Even so, in 1900, Congress passed the Gold Standard Act, formally placing the United States on that standard. Although Bryan ran again on a silver platform in the 1900 presidential election, the issue failed to produce the same resonance with the voters. McKinley won more easily than in 1896, making inroads in the silver West.

== Legacy ==
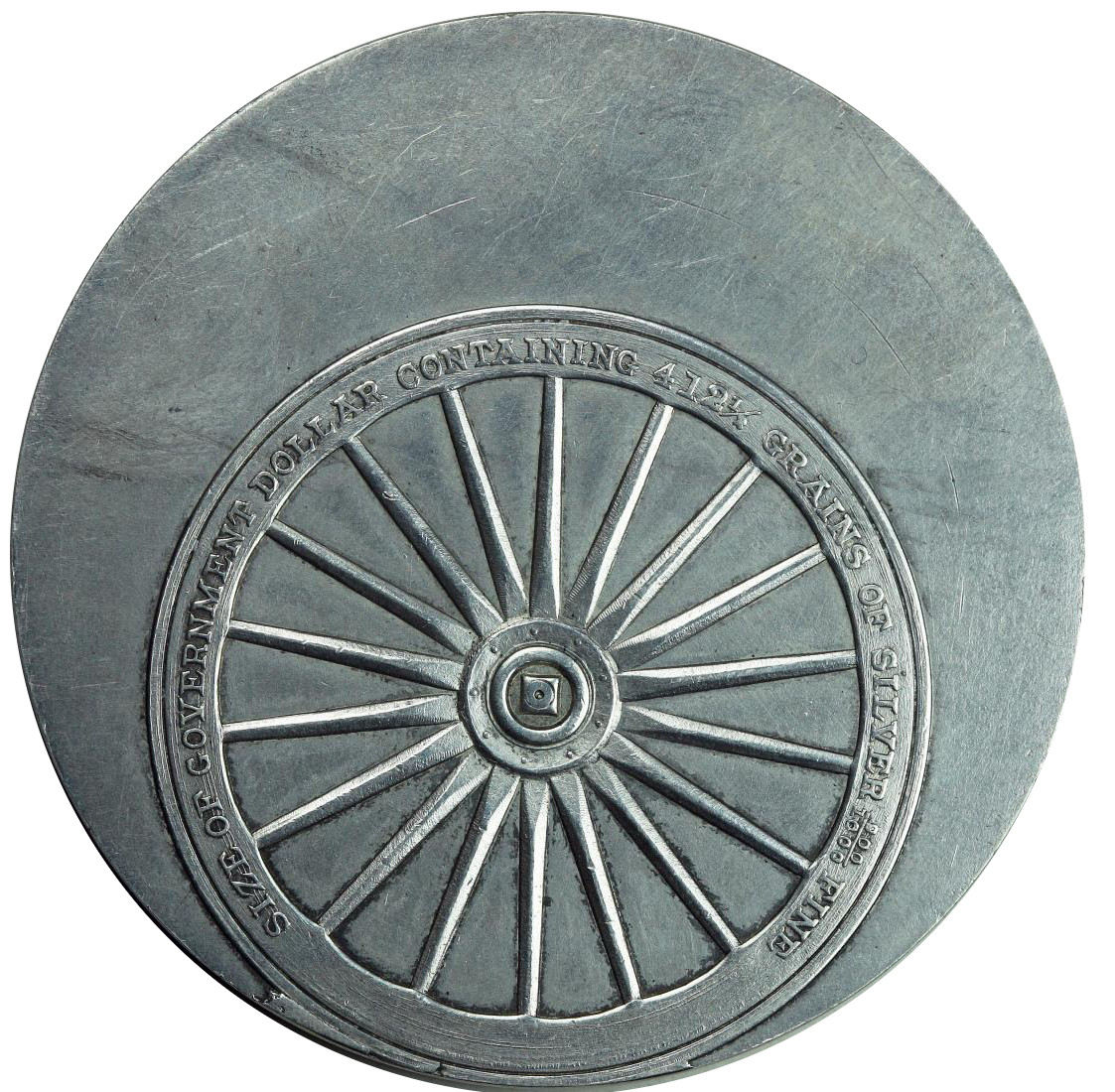
A "Bryan dollar" issued by his opponents to illustrate the difference between the size of a silver dollar and the amount of bullion that could be purchased with a dollar.

Bryan's speech is considered one of the most powerful political addresses in American history. Stanley Jones, however, suggested that even if Bryan had never delivered it, he would still have been nominated. Jones deemed the Democrats likely to nominate a candidate who would appeal to the Populist Party, and Bryan had been elected to Congress with Populist support. According to rhetorical historian William Harpine in his study of the rhetoric of the 1896 campaign, "Bryan's speech cast a net for the true believers, but only for the true believers." Harpine suggested that, "by appealing in such an uncompromising way to the agrarian elements and to the West, Bryan neglected the national audience who would vote in the November election". Bryan's emphasis on agrarian issues, both in his speech and in his candidacy, may have helped cement voting patterns which kept the Democrats largely out of power until the 1930s.

Writer Edgar Lee Masters called the speech, "the beginning of a changed America." Bryan's words gave rise to later economic and political philosophies, including Huey Long's 1930s Share Our Wealth program, with its trigger phrase, "Every Man a King" inspired by Bryan's speech. Author and political commentator William Safire, in his political dictionary, traced the term "trickle-down economics" (common in the Reagan era) to Bryan's statement that some believe that government should legislate for the wealthy, and allow prosperity to "leak through" on those below. Historian R. Hal Williams suggested that the opposite philosophy, of legislation for the masses leading to prosperity for all, advocated by Bryan in his speech, informed the domestic policies of later Democratic presidents, including Franklin Roosevelt with his New Deal.

Bensel ties the delegates' response to Bryan's address to their uncertainty in their own beliefs:

In a very real sense, adoption of the silver plank in the platform was akin to a millennial expectation that the "laws of economics" would henceforth be suspended and that the silver men could simply "will" that silver and gold would, in fact, trade on financial markets at a ratio of sixteen to one. The silver men were thus in the hunt for a charismatic leader who would underpin what they already desperately wanted to believe. They manufactured that leader in the convention, a fabrication in which Bryan was only too happy to assist.
