= Coinage Act of 1873 =

Revision of the laws relating to the Mint of the United States

- Other short titles: Mint Act of 1873; Fourth Coinage Act
- Long title: An Act revising and amending the Laws relative to the Mints, Assay-offices, and Coinage of the United States
- Nicknames: Crime of 1873
- Enacted by: the 42nd United States Congress
- Effective: April 1, 1873

Citations
- Public law: 42–131
- Statutes at Large: 17 Stat. 424

Legislative history
- Introduced in the House as H.R. 2934; Passed the House on May 27, 1872 (110–13); Passed the Senate on January 17, 1873 (passed); Reported by the joint conference committee on or before February 6, 1873; agreed to by the Senate on February 6, 1873 (passed) and by the House on February 7, 1873 (passed); Signed into law by President Ulysses S. Grant on February 12, 1873

The Coinage Act of 1873 or Mint Act of 1873 was a general revision of laws relating to the Mint of the United States. By ending the right of holders of silver bullion to have it coined into standard silver dollars, while allowing holders of gold to continue to have their bullion made into money, the act created a gold standard by default. It also authorized a Trade dollar, with limited legal tender, intended for export, mainly to Asia, and abolished three small-denomination coins. The act led to controversial results and was denounced by critics as the "Crime of '73".

By 1869, the Mint Act of 1837, enacted before the California gold rush or the American Civil War affected the monetary system of the United States, was deemed outdated. Treasury Secretary George Boutwell had Deputy Comptroller of the Currency John Jay Knox draft a revised law, introduced into Congress by Ohio Senator John Sherman. Silver's market price then exceeded the value at which the Mint would purchase the metal, suppressing the demand for bullion to be struck into silver dollars. However, Knox and others correctly forecast that development of the Comstock Lode and other rich silver mines would lower silver's market price, making the option of having bullion struck into legal-tender coins attractive. Congress considered the bill for almost three years before passage. During its consideration, it was rarely publicly mentioned, but also was not concealed, that the bill would establish a gold standard by ending bimetallism. The bill became the Act of February 12, 1873, with the signature of President Ulysses S. Grant, and became effective on April 1 of that year.

In 1876, when silver's market price indeed dropped as forecast, producers brought silver bullion to the Mint only to learn that the Mint no longer was authorized to coin it. The matter became a major political controversy that lasted the remainder of the century, pitting those who valued the deflationary gold standard against those who believed free coinage of silver, an inflationary policy, to be necessary for economic prosperity. Despite contemporary accusations, scant evidence exists that the 1873 act had a corrupt motivation. The political dispute was settled when the gold standard was explicitly enacted into law in 1900. Beginning in March 1933, the United States rapidly abandoned the gold standard in favor of fiat currency for almost all purposes. The United States abandoned the dollar's final formal link to gold in 1971, leaving gold and silver as commodities.

== Background ==
The Mint Act of 1792 established the Mint of the United States. The Mint, in its first decades, only coined gold and silver in response to deposits of that metal by citizens, returning the bullion to the depositor in the form of coins. Either gold or silver could be presented for conversion into currency; as both metals were legal tender, a dollar was equal to both a legally defined weight of silver, and another legally defined quantity of gold. Having a currency defined in terms of two different metals is called bimetallism. Such a system may experience instability as the price of gold and silver on the world market changes, and this took place in the first decades after 1792, as the relative values of gold and silver in Europe changed. At that time, gold or silver U.S. coins were rarely seen in the nation, as they were heavily exported because of such shifts—most pieces in circulation were foreign in origin.

In 1834, Congress made a dollar worth slightly less, thus lightening U.S. gold and silver coins (known collectively as specie), making them uneconomical to export, and they were seen more often in commerce within the U.S. With this greater circulation, Congress re-examined the existing statutes relating to the Mint, and found many provisions to be obsolete. It enacted the Mint Act of 1837, a thorough revision of the statutes relating to the Mint. New provisions included the establishment of a bullion fund, allowing depositors to be paid without waiting for their metal to go through the coining process. The ratio of value between equivalent weights of gold and silver was adjusted slightly, allowing coins of both metals to circulate within the U.S.

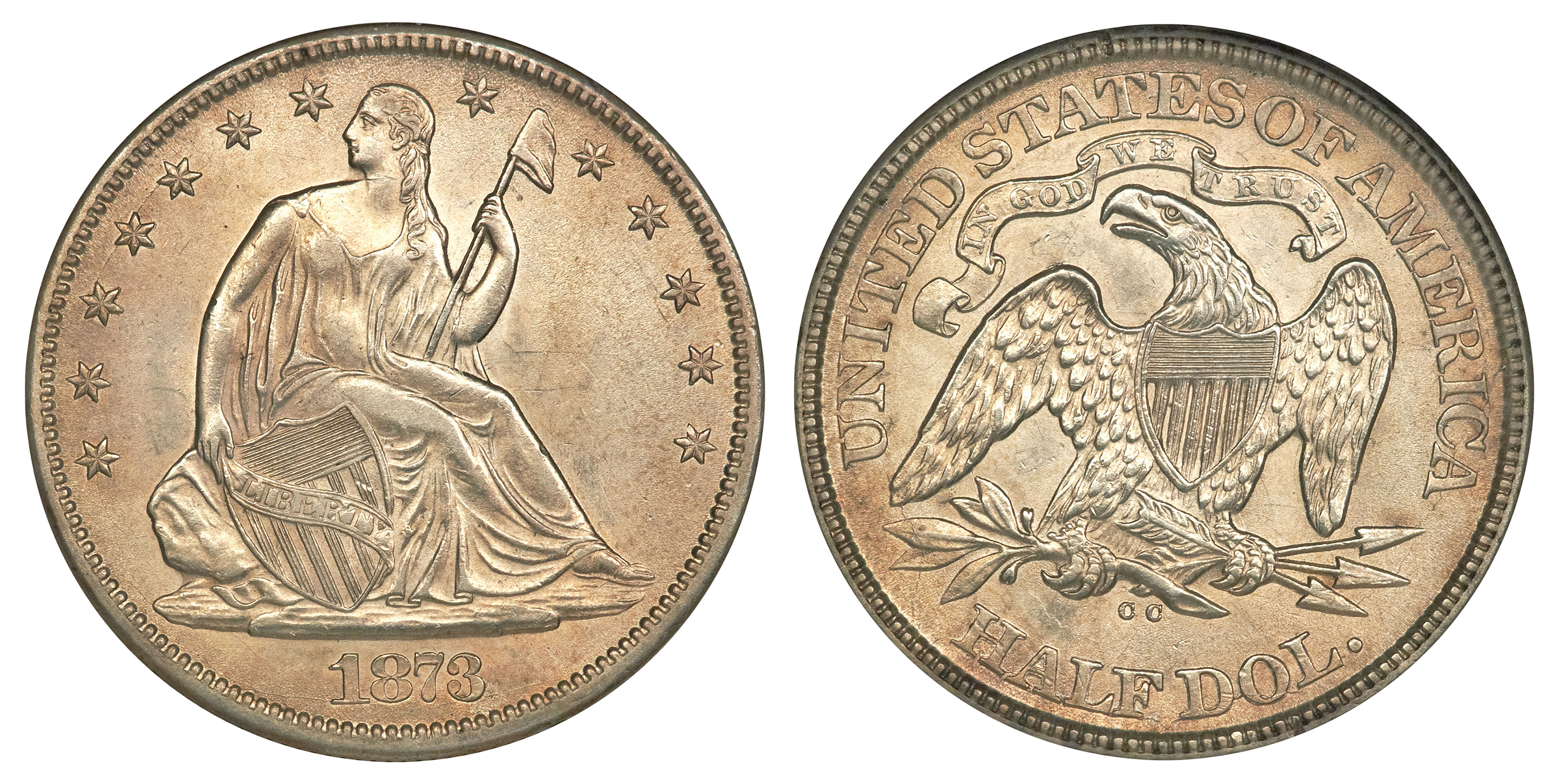
Under an 1853 act, depositors could no longer have their metal struck into half dollars.

When silver prices rose relative to gold as a reaction to the California Gold Rush, silver coinage was worth more than face value, and rapidly flowed overseas for melting. Despite vocal opposition led by Tennessee Representative (and future president) Andrew Johnson, the precious metal content of smaller silver coins was reduced in 1853, allowing them to circulate. Until then, depositors of silver could choose to have their bullion struck into silver coins of any denomination of five cents or above; the Act of 1853 lightened the silver coins from the half dime to the half dollar and eliminated the right of the depositor to have silver struck into those denominations. Depositors could still choose to have silver struck into dollar coins, but since there was more than a dollar's worth of silver in a dollar coin, it was more profitable to sell the bullion to manufacturers and jewelers. So long as silver prices remained high, this effectively placed the United States on the gold standard.

Although the Mint rarely received deposits of silver for striking into coins after 1853, it purchased silver bullion using the new lightweight silver coins at above-market prices. This was illegal, as Congress had ordered that the new lightweight coins only be purchasable using gold, a provision intended to limit quantities sold to actual demand. As the silver pieces had a legal tender limit of $5, if excessive numbers were circulated, they might choke commerce. This in fact occurred, and merchants and bankers complained that the legal tender limit was causing them to have to sell accumulations at a discount to brokers.

The glut was replaced with a shortage when most federal coins were hoarded amid the economic chaos of the Civil War. Slowest to vanish was the base-metal cent, which only had value because government said it did, and at that time, confidence in government was shaken. Eventually, it too vanished from circulation and commanded a premium for change. A variety of makeshifts replaced the vanished coins, such as fractional currency and merchant's tokens. Beginning in 1864, Congress began to authorize base metal coins that would not be hoarded. It reduced the weight of the cent, causing it to be made of bronze, and also required a two-cent piece of the same metal. The following year saw the initiation of the three-cent nickel and in 1866, the five-cent nickel (today simply known as the nickel) began production. The two-cent piece, initially popular, saw declining mintages as the public preferred the smaller, more convenient nickel (Note: Actually, 25 percent nickel and 75 percent copper.) coins.

Greenbacks, which were backed by neither silver nor gold but by the credit of the United States, and which were necessitated by vast wartime expenditures, had helped to finance the war. In the late 1860s, politicians disagreed about how quickly to have the government resume paying out gold and silver in payment of its obligations. Treasury Secretary Hugh McCulloch felt the best way to return to that practice was to withdraw the greenbacks as quickly as possible, and he did so until stopped by Congress, which felt his contractionist stand was hurting the economy. More and more silver was being mined in the Far West. Falls in the price of the metal made the option of depositing silver at the Mint in exchange for coin more attractive, and mintages of the silver dollar rose considerably in the late 1860s and into the 1870s. The silver dollar was fully legal tender, and some officials worried that the increased deposits would cause silver to drive gold from circulation as predicted by Gresham's law, endangering the gold standard.

As it had been two decades since much silver was regularly deposited for striking into coins, the fact that the United States had been on a bimetallic standard since 1792 was often forgotten. The gold standard was seen as the only possible choice, and many people assumed that the United States was on that standard, which had been adopted by strong nations like the United Kingdom (1816) and the German Empire (1871).

== Inception ==
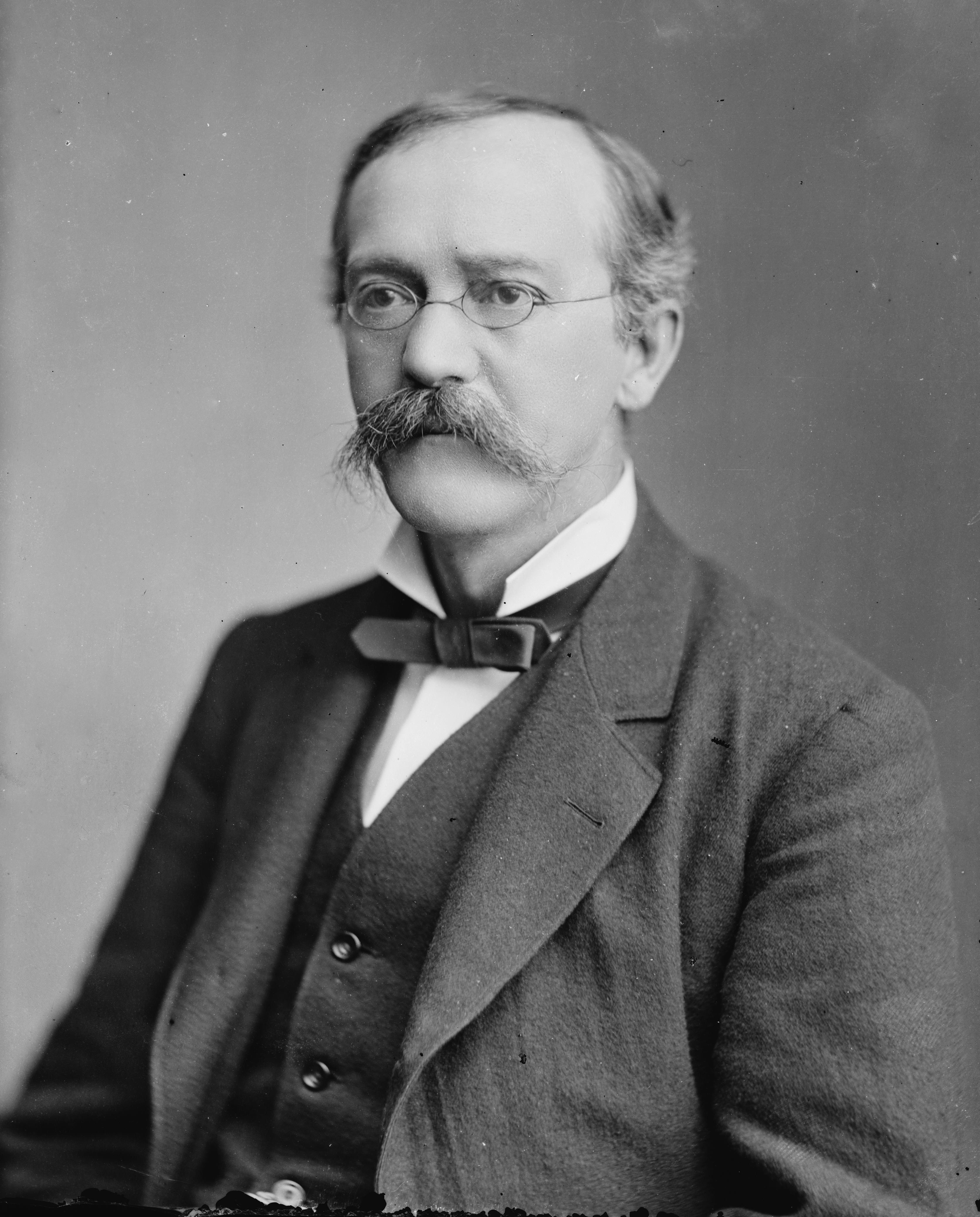
John Jay Knox, photographed by Mathew Brady

Losses of nearly $250,000 (equal to $5,497,159 today) at the San Francisco Mint had concerned the Treasury, and, in 1866, McCullough sent John Jay Knox, a Treasury employee, on a special investigatory mission. Knox found that informalities in transferring bullion between various officers of that mint had led to inconsistent sets of accounts, but due to the lack of receipts kept, it was not possible to pinpoint who was to blame. In 1869, Knox, by then Deputy Comptroller of the Currency, was sent by McCullough's successor George Boutwell to investigate other Mint facilities, discovering severe irregularities and large government losses at the New York Assay Office. Knox again discovered a dearth of proper accounting procedures, and that officials there had trouble finding a copy of the Mint's regulations.

In 1867, an international monetary conference was held in Paris to discuss how to have gold coins of various countries struck to a common standard. Slight adjustments to the British gold sovereign and to the five-dollar gold piece (or half eagle) would make each equal to 25 francs, and it was proposed that the British and Americans make those changes while France began striking a 25-franc piece. None of this ever came to fruition, but in January 1868, Ohio Senator John Sherman introduced legislation to place the United States formally on the gold standard, to eliminate silver as a legal tender, and to implement the recommendations of the conference.

Knox, in his 1866 report, had recommended a thorough revision of the laws pertaining to the Mint, and in January 1870, Secretary Boutwell instructed him to prepare a draft. In this, Knox had the assistance of former Mint Director Henry Linderman, who then held a roving commission for the Treasury Department; Linderman would in 1873 become the first director of the Bureau of the Mint.

Knox completed a draft bill, intended to repeal many antiquated legal provisions, and to rewrite others. He proposed to eliminate the standard silver dollar (he proposed a lightweight silver dollar that would have a low legal tender limit), move the office of the Director of the Mint from Philadelphia to Washington, eliminate the Mint's charge to strike gold bullion (then 0.5 percent), and abolish the office of Treasurer at the mints and assay offices, transferring its functions to the superintendent. In drafting the bill, Knox consulted with a number of former Mint officers besides Linderman, such as former directors James Ross Snowden and Robert M. Patterson, as well as former Philadelphia Mint Chief Coiner Franklin Peale. Mint Director James Pollard submitted the bill to Congress on April 25, 1870.

== Consideration and passage ==
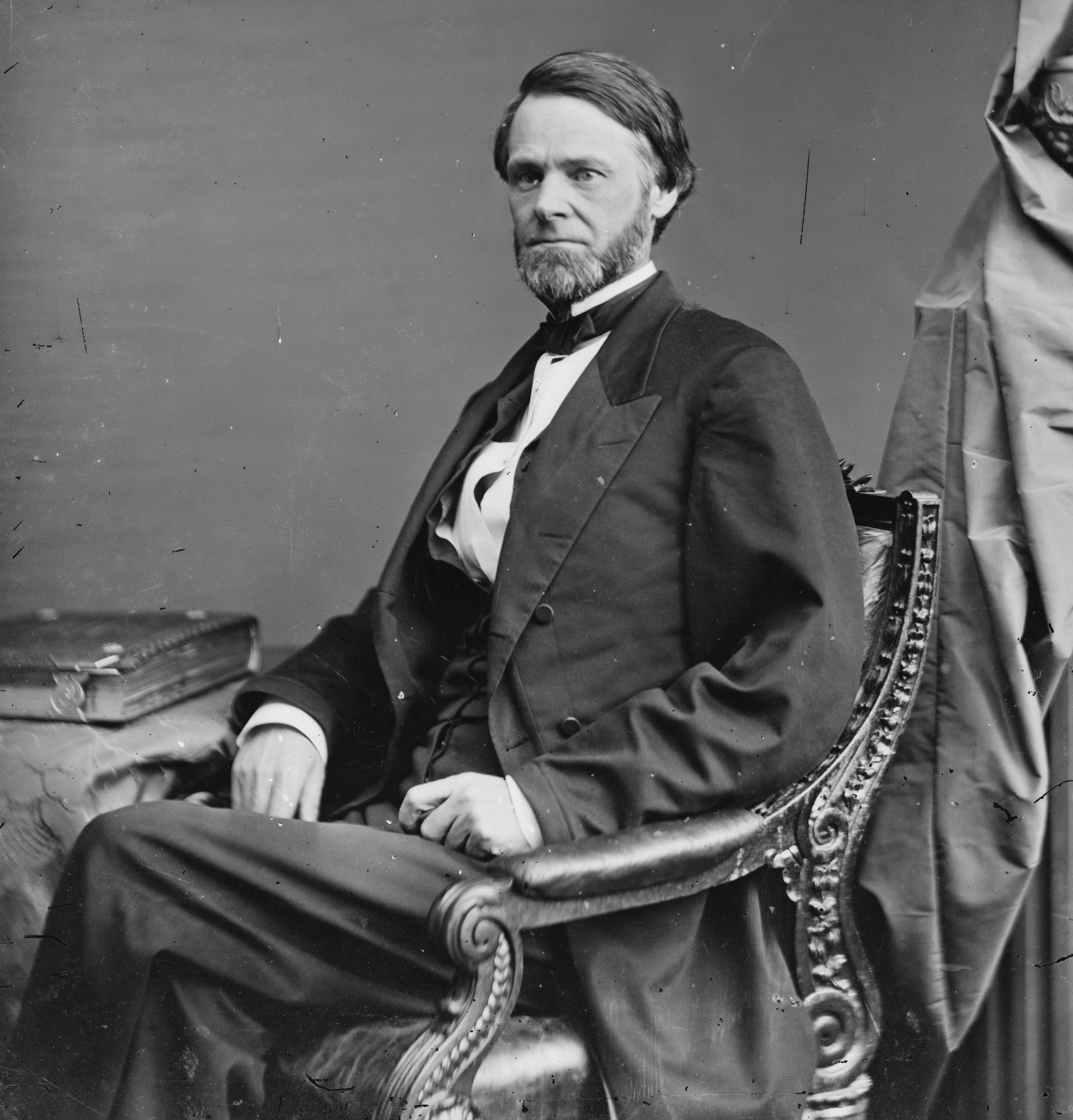
Senator John Sherman shepherded the bill through Congress.

Sherman introduced the bill on April 28, 1870, and it was referred to the Senate Finance Committee, of which he was chairman. He did not seek its passage in that session of Congress, as lawmakers were busy with other financial legislation. The bill attracted next to no newspaper attention throughout the period of almost three years it was under consideration, though monetary experts and others watched its progress closely. On January 9, 1871, Sherman brought the bill to the Senate floor for debate. That it abolished the silver dollar, and thus bimetallism, was not discussed, as senators focused on the omission of the coinage charge (the fee for the Mint's services in converting bullion to money). This was of importance to the Senate—especially members from the Far West—because it affected what mining companies and refiners (an important economic interest) could get for their product. Sherman offered an amendment to retain the coinage charge, but it was attacked by Western senators as an unjust tax on miners and refiners of gold, and the amendment was defeated, 26–23. On January 10, the bill passed the Senate, 36–14, with Sherman voting against his own bill. It was then sent to the House of Representatives and referred to the Committee on Coinage, Weights, and Measures from which it was briefly brought forth on February 25 by Pennsylvania's William D. Kelley, the chairman, before being recommitted to committee. The bill was not considered by the House during the remainder of the 41st Congress, which expired on March 3, 1871, and the Senate-passed bill died with it.

Kelley reintroduced the bill in the House when Congress reconvened in December 1871. Chairman Kelley was from Philadelphia, and was influenced by industrialist Joseph Wharton, who owned a nickel refinery in nearby Camden, New Jersey, from which the Mint purchased, without competitive bidding, much of the metal for the three-cent and five-cent base metal coins. The bill at that time proposed that the cent, then made of bronze, be made of nickel alloy as well—when it was debated on January 9, 1872, Wharton's interest was an immediate target. Kelley was quizzed by New York Representative Clarkson Potter, who called the bill "this Pennsylvania contrivance" which would give "a monopoly to the gentleman in Pennsylvania [Wharton]." Another New Yorker, Dwight Townsend, moved to scuttle the bill in disgust over how long it was taking to pass; his motion on voice vote would have succeeded, but there was no quorum and it failed on a roll call vote. On January 10, Missouri Congressman James R. McCormick, who represented nickel producers in his home state, introduced an amendment for competitive bidding for nickel purchases by the Mint. Rather than accede to McCormick's amendment, Kelley sent the bill back to committee.

When the bill was brought back to the House floor on April 9, 1872, it was managed by Massachusetts Representative Samuel Hooper, chairman of the House Committee on Banking and Currency. He went through the bill section by section, and stated the bill would place the United States on the gold standard. In the ensuing debate, other representatives, including Potter and Kelley, showed their understanding of that. The bill now provided for competitive nickel bidding, but was again withdrawn, this time by Hooper, after Kelley accused Potter of trying to benefit New York bullion merchants. This fracas caused other New Yorkers to oppose the bill. On May 27, Hooper presented a substitute bill, which he got passed, 110–13, without it even being read. Among the changes that the House made to Knox's bill were a slight increase in weight of the subsidiary (Note: Even with the increase, a dollar's worth of the smaller coins weighed less than the to-be-abolished silver dollar, thus they were subsidiary.) silver coins (the dime, quarter dollar, and half dollar), making a dollar in them weigh 25 grams (0.88 oz).

The bill then awaited Congress reconvening in December. Early in that month, Secretary Boutwell issued his annual report, calling for the passage of the legislation. On the 16th, the bill was referred to Sherman's committee. It emerged without the plan to make the cent from copper-nickel, and with the lightweight silver dollar (Note: Bimetallism would not have remained with the retention of the lightweight dollar. The new coins would only have been issued on government order: thus, depositors of bullion could not have had their metal converted into the lightweight pieces. The proposed piece was to be struck to the standard of the subsidiary coins, thus two half dollars would have weighed the same as one of the new dollars. See Taxay, p. 257, Van Ryzin, p. 107.) replaced with a Trade dollar intended for commerce in the Far East, having limited legal tender status in the U.S. The bill was reported back to the Senate on January 7, 1873. It was debated there on the 17th.

One topic of discussion was the bill's requirement that an eagle appear on larger U.S. coins. Linderman had requested an amendment to require that gold and silver coins bear a statement of their weight and fineness, which would mean sacrificing the eagle. California's Eugene Casserly opposed the amendment, which was sponsored by Sherman, stating "it will hardly be possible to think of a half dollar or a quarter dollar as being such a coin without the eagle upon it". The eagle was saved when the amendment failed, 24 in favor and 26 against. Casserly was less successful with an amendment to remove entirely the reduced coinage charge of 0.2 percent, which failed. Sherman moved the bill along as quickly as he could, and it passed without a recorded vote. The House initially refused to agree to the Trade dollar; representatives of both houses, led by Sherman and Potter, met in a conference committee, and the House acceded to the Senate amendment for the Trade dollar. The bill passed both houses without further debate, and was signed by President Ulysses S. Grant on February 12, 1873. At no point in its almost three-year journey through the legislative process did the bill provide for the retention of the standard silver dollar, into which depositors could have their bullion coined.

=== Intent of the bill's authors ===
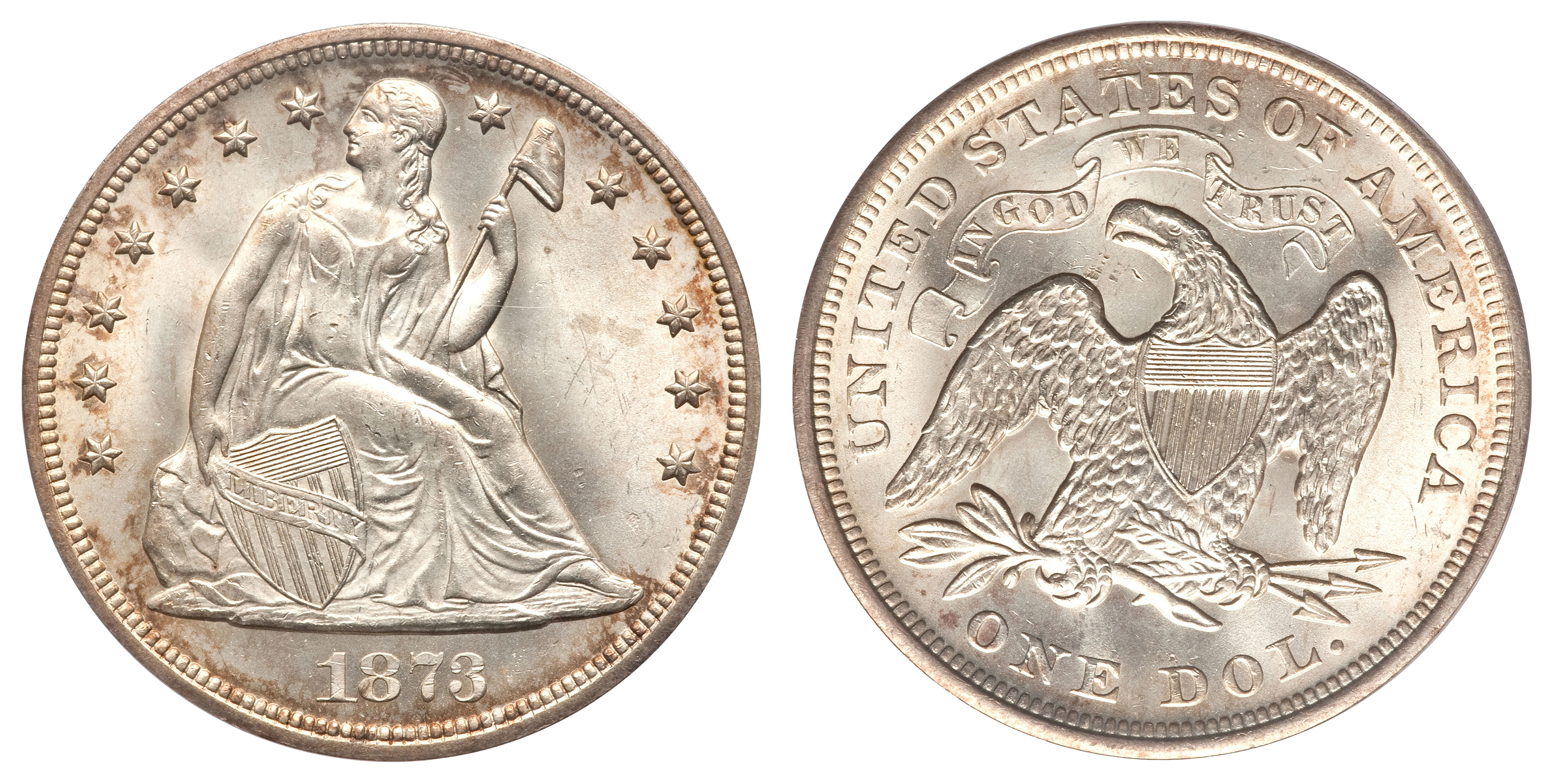
The standard silver dollar was abolished by the Coinage Act of 1873.

When, several years after its passage, the 1873 law became a political issue, some of those involved in enacting it, including Sherman and Linderman, stated that there had been no intent to end bimetallism in the elimination of the authority for private citizens to have silver bullion coined into dollars. They argued that the 1853 legislation had ended the practice of having bullion struck into smaller-denomination coins; the 1873 act simply rectified an omission and eliminated a coin with a low mintage that did not circulate. They were not always consistent in their denials: Boutwell wrote in his memoirs that "in 1873 I had come to believe that it was wise for every nation to recognize, establish, and maintain the gold standard ... hence it was that I determined to abandon the idea of a double [i.e., bimetallic] standard.

Within a few years, the idea that the omission of the silver dollar from the Coinage Act had not been with intent to place the United States on the gold standard became the establishment position. Part of this was in reaction against the conspiracy theories that were circulating about the "Crime of '73", as advocates of bimetallism called the act. This was accepted by many historians well into the 20th century. Neil Carothers, in his 1930 history of small-denomination U.S. currency, wrote that "many others have demonstrated that this was not a corrupt or surreptitious action by the enemies of silver. The elimination of the standard silver dollar was simply in the interests of clarifying the coinage law ... Not one party to the passage of the law of 1873 recognized the significance of the abolition of the legally existing double standard." According to historian Allen Weinstein, "Silver's demonetization, according to the traditional account, came as an unplanned if fortunate by-product of a complex and largely technical revision of the mint laws in the Coinage Act of 1873."

Economist Milton Friedman wrote, "what is not open to question is that the standard silver dollar was omitted from the list of coins to be minted intentionally, in full knowledge of the likely consequences, and in the belief that those consequences were desirable." He cited Walter T. K. Nugent's 1968 book, Money and American Society, 1865–1880,

as Nugent documents in great detail, Senator John Sherman, chairman of the Senate Finance Committee, had been determined to demonetize silver from at least 1867 and had arranged to have a bill to that effect drafted at the end of 1869. From then on, Sherman, Linderman, John Jay Knox (deputy comptroller of the currency and then comptroller), and Secretary of the Treasury George Boutwell cooperated to push a coinage bill that included the demonitization of silver.

Knox and Linderman were both personally familiar with mining conditions in the Far West. They knew that the amount of bullion produced was only going to increase, and would likely drop the price of silver below the level ($1.2929 per troy ounce) at which the metal in a silver dollar was worth more as bullion than as money. In his explanatory statement accompanying his draft bill, Knox explained the discontinuance of the silver dollar would mean the United States was no longer a bimetallic nation. Boutwell, in his 1872 annual report, urged Congress to end the coinage of silver from private deposits, lest the government take a loss from paying out gold in exchange for the silver dollars, and ultimately having to melt them when they could not be circulated. According to Nugent, "Were Knox, Linderman, Boutwell, Sherman, and others aware of what they were doing when they planned to drop the silver dollar? It is inconceivable that they were not; Knox's statement was explicit. But did they urge it because they feared a drop in silver prices? No one made an explicit statement to that effect, but it was undoubtedly the case."

== Provisions ==
=== Bureau of the Mint; duties of officers (§§1–12) ===
Text of the Coinage Act of 1873

The Director of the Mint had always been located at the Philadelphia Mint, with the other mints and assay offices governed by superintendents of whom the director was in charge. The 1873 act moved the office to Washington, where the director supervised the new Bureau of the Mint and remained in charge of all mints and assay offices. The Mint Director required appointment by the president and confirmation by the Senate and served a term of five years (unless removed by the president). Henceforth, the Philadelphia Mint would be under the immediate control of a superintendent, like the other mints. The act also formally made the bureau part of the Department of the Treasury. The Mint of the United States had originally reported directly to the president but over time legislation had made it subject to control by the Treasury Secretary.

Little change was made to the officers of the mints, other than adding a superintendent for Philadelphia (Pollock would be the first incumbent), and abolishing the office of Treasurer at each facility. In addition to the superintendent, each mint had as officers the Assayer, the Melter and Refiner, and the Coiner; each was required to post a bond to indemnify the government against losses during their tenure of office, and each was responsible for part of the coining process. Philadelphia also had an Engraver (sometimes Chief Engraver), responsible for preparing coinage dies and designs, though the Director of the Mint could, with the agreement of the Treasury Secretary, hire outside artists to design coins. The provision allowing for the hiring of outside artists was inserted at the suggestion of former director Patterson. The act set the salaries and bonding requirements for the officers, and required them to be appointed by the president and confirmed by the Senate, as was the case under both the 1792 and 1837 acts. It also set forth the procedures for appointment of an acting officer or Director of the Mint, in the case of the incumbent's temporary absence.

=== Coins and deposit of bullion (§§13–39) ===
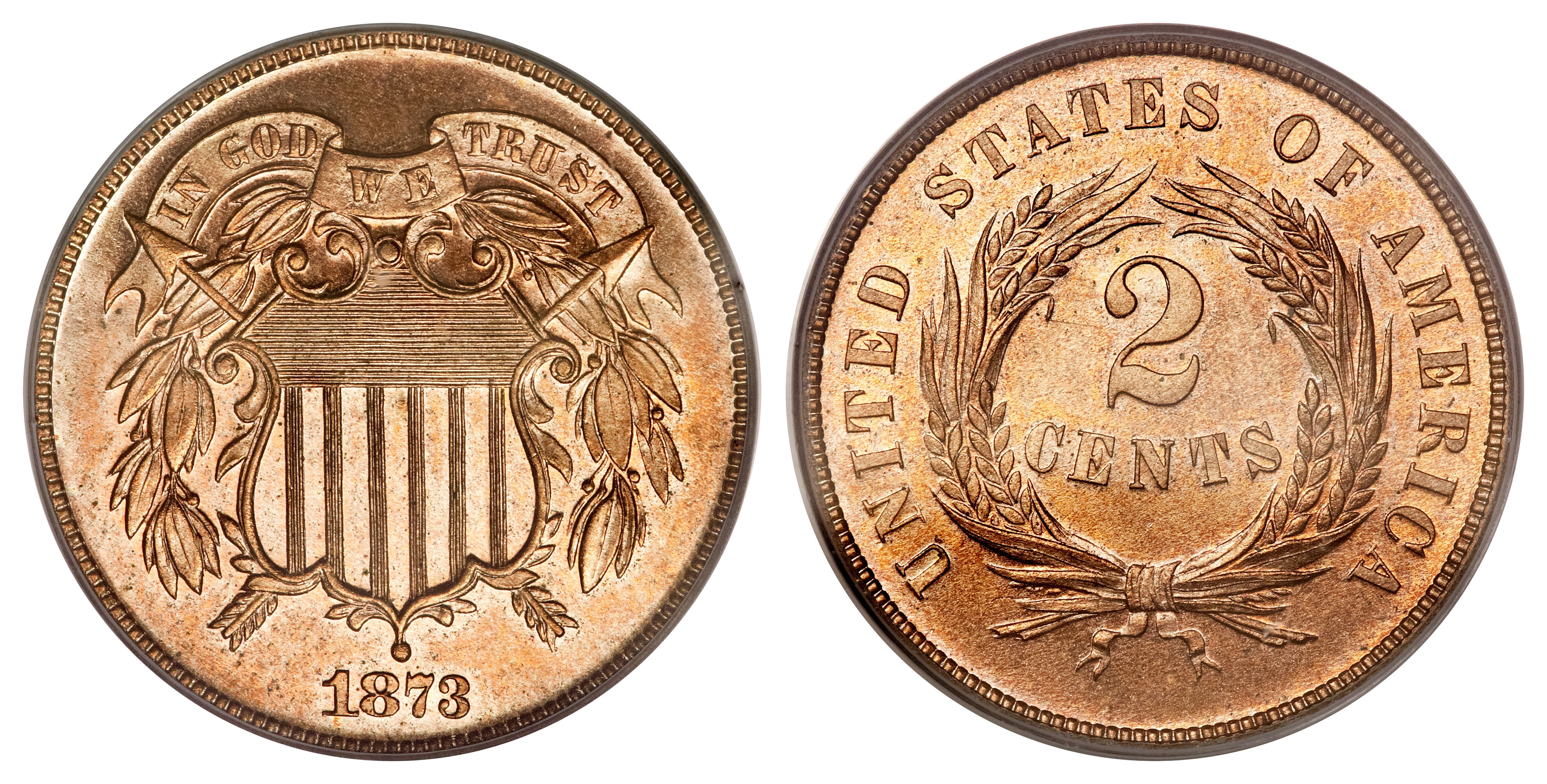
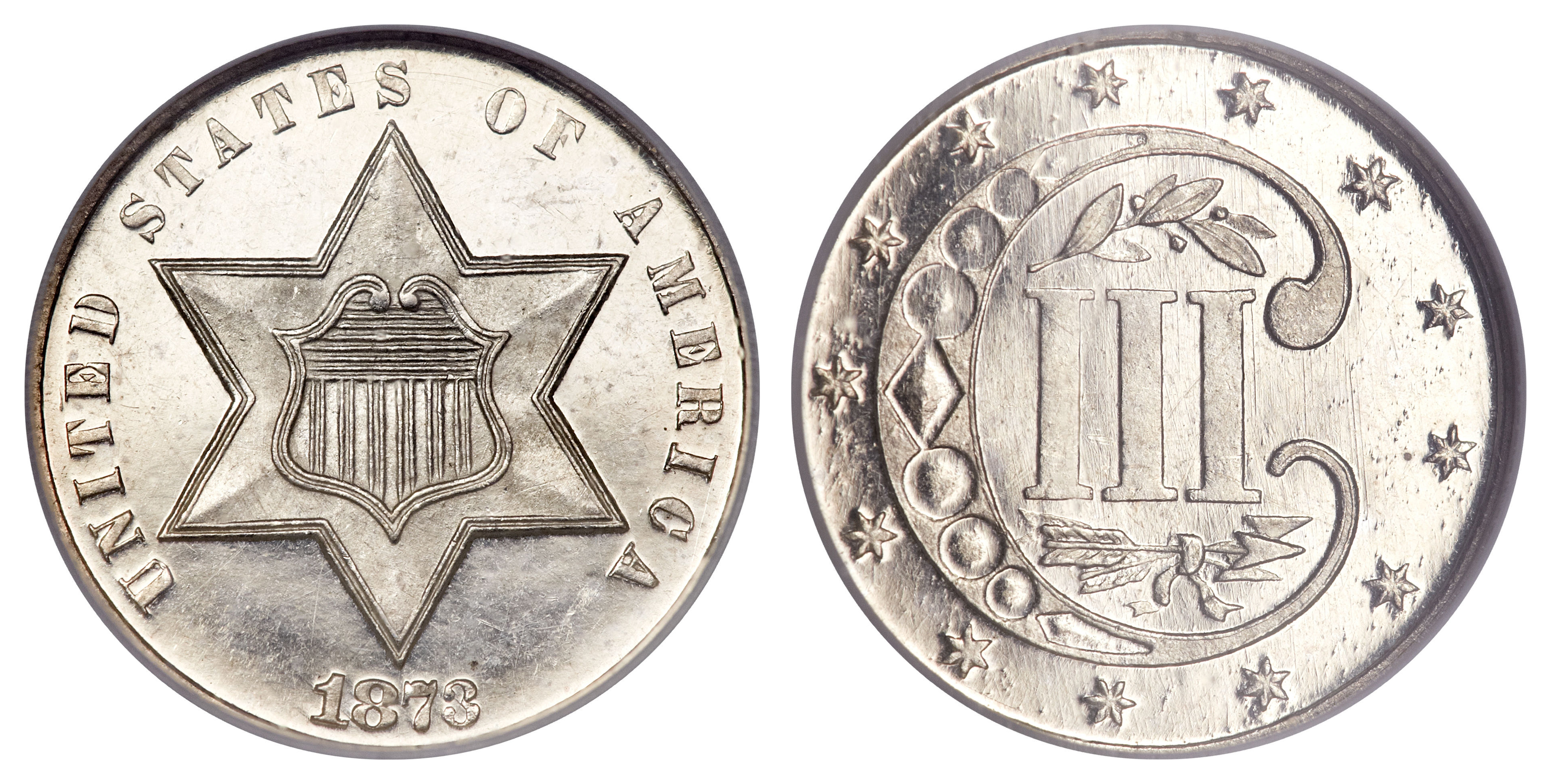
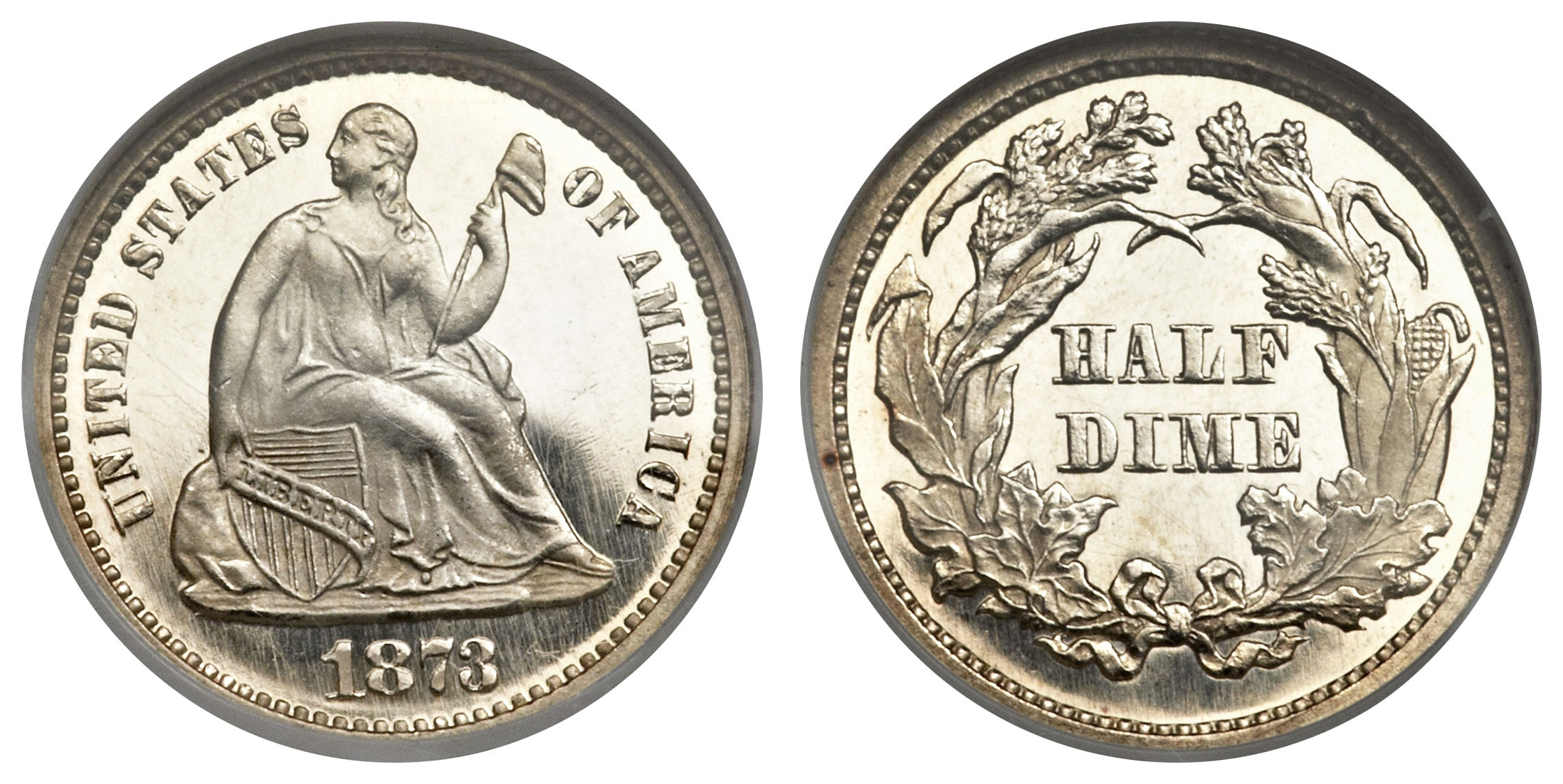
The two-cent piece, three-cent silver, and half dime were discontinued by the Coinage Act of 1873.

Sections 14 to 16 of the act set forth the coins authorized to be struck by the Mint Bureau. This is the part of the act that would later prove contentious, as it omitted the standard silver dollar, since 1853 the only coin into which depositors of silver bullion could have their metal struck. It did allow for a Trade dollar, of higher weight than the old coin, that depositors could have their silver made into, but the legal tender of this and all silver coins was limited to $5—the old silver dollar had an unlimited legal tender. All gold coins had unlimited legal tender, and the act made provision for the redemption of gold coin abraded below normal weight at full value, if twenty years or more old and if still containing 99.5 percent or more of the authorized weight. Lightweight gold coin that did not meet these qualifications would have the loss in value fall upon the depositor.

Also eliminated by the 1873 act were the two-cent piece, three-cent silver and half dime. Although the first two coins circulated little, the half dime was still being heavily struck by the San Francisco Mint for use in the Far West, where paper money was disfavored. The coins authorized by the 1873 act were the cent, three-cent nickel, five-cent nickel, dime, quarter, half dollar, Trade dollar, gold dollar, quarter eagle, three-dollar piece, half eagle, eagle, and double eagle.

The act prescribed the specifications of each coin. No change was made to the bronze composition of the cent. The dime, quarter, and half dollar were made slightly heavier so that a dollar in these coins would weigh 25 grams (0.88 oz), in a nod to the metric system—the five-cent nickel already weighed 5 grams (0.18 oz). It required that the obverse of each American coin be emblematic of Liberty, and that an eagle must appear on the reverse, except for the small-diameter cent, three-cent nickel, five-cent nickel, dime, gold dollar, and three-dollar piece, on which an eagle could not appear. It required the use of the country's name on the reverse, and of "E Pluribus Unum" somewhere on the coin. It allowed the motto "In God We Trust" to appear on American coinage—continuing permission granted in the Act of March 3, 1865, which had authorized the three-cent nickel. The 1873 law allowed for the redemption of current or obsolete base-metal coinage by the Treasury when presented in lots of $20 or more, continuing a provision enacted in 1871.

Further provisions in this part of the act allowed depositors of silver bullion to receive their metal back in the form of bars or in Trade dollars. It forbade deposit of silver for striking into other coins, but allowed the Mint, for two years, to purchase silver bullion with silver coins at Philadelphia and at the New York Assay Office. This practice, although illegal under the 1853 act, had long been permitted by Mint Directors.

=== Testing and the Assay Commission (§§40–50) ===
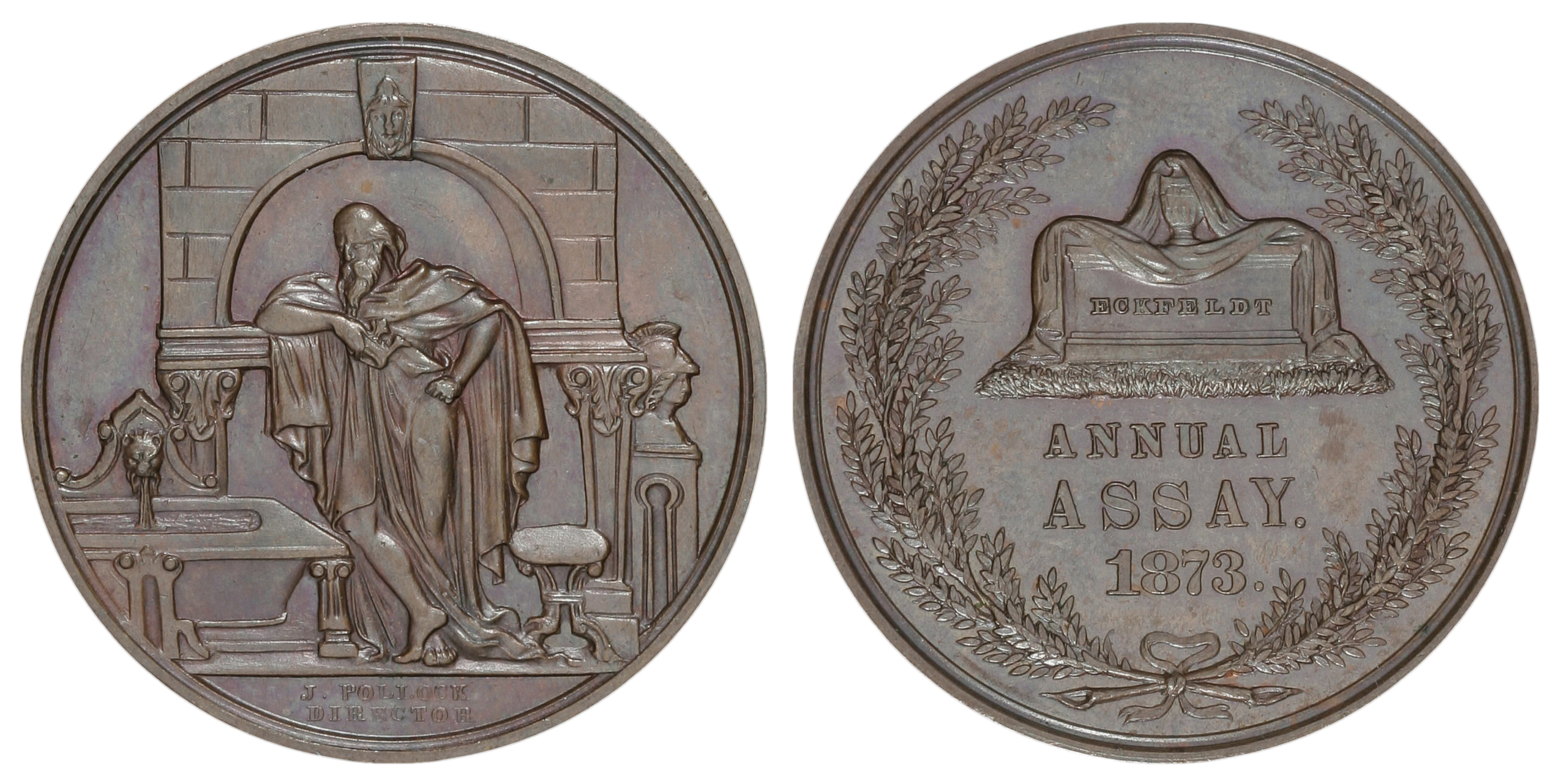
Medal (by Chief Engraver William Barber) struck for the 1873 Assay Commission. The casket on the reverse honors Philadelphia Mint Assayer Jacob Eckfeldt, who had recently died.

The annual Assay Commission met at the Philadelphia Mint in most years from 1797 to 1980, when it was abolished. Consisting of government officials and members of the public, it tested the gold and silver coins issued by the Mint to ensure they met standards.

The 1837 act had designated the judge of the United States District Court for the Eastern District of Pennsylvania, the United States Attorney for that district, and the Collector of the Port of Philadelphia as members ex officio of the Assay Commission. The Coinage Act of 1873 kept the judge as a member, but omitted the other two, substituting the Comptroller of the Currency and the assayer of the New York Assay Office. Under the 1837 act, the president was allowed to appoint members of the public each year, and this continued under the new legislation. The 1873 law also prescribed a detailed procedure for taking samples from each delivery by that mint's Coiner, sealing them in envelopes and transmitting them to Philadelphia, where the Assay Commission met each February.

This part of the Coinage Act also provided as to how the Coiner should settle accounts, for internal testing of coins outside the auspices of the Assay Commission, and continued the bullion fund, allowing depositors of gold or silver to receive coins or other payment without having to wait for the actual metal they had deposited to go through the coining process. The mints were required to have a set of weights conforming to the official weight weighing one troy pound purchased by the U.S. minister in London in 1827, and to have the ones at Philadelphia tested in the presence of the Assay Commission each year.

=== Criminal offenses and miscellaneous provisions (§§51–67) ===
Sections 51 to 53 regulated matters that had proved controversial in past decades. Section 51 required all obverse dies (containing the date on most denominations) to be destroyed at the conclusion of each year. Under Director Snowden in the 1850s, the Mint had restruck rare early-dated coins to sell or exchange with collectors. Medals of a national nature could be struck at Philadelphia under Section 52, but private medals were forbidden. Until 1854, the year in which he was fired by President Franklin Pierce, Peale had conducted a controversial medals business on the premises of the Philadelphia Mint. Section 53 required the bureau's profits from seigniorage to be deposited in the Treasury and forbade the Mint from paying expenses or salaries from that money. Under Director Patterson (retired 1851), the Mint had retained such earnings, and spent them without congressional oversight.

The assay offices were regulated by sections 54 through 60, under the control of the Director of the Mint. Each office would be governed in a manner similar to the mints, with a superintendent in charge and two subordinate officers: an Assayer and a Melter and Refiner. Sections 61 to 64 forbade counterfeiting, intentional lightening of coins to secure metal, and other offenses, and prescribed the punishments for them. Section 65 is a transition provision, setting an April 1, 1873 effective date, as well as providing that the current Director of the Mint (Pollock) would become superintendent at Philadelphia, and the occupants of the office of Treasurer at each mint (abolished by the legislation) would become Assistant Treasurers of the United States. Section 66 names each mint and assay office, and Section 67 names the legislation as the "Coinage Act of one thousand eight hundred and seventy-three".

== Aftermath ==
=== Later reaction ===
The abolition of the half dime, still circulating in the Far West, led to shortages of small change there. Congress tried to address this with the unpopular twenty-cent piece, which was struck for circulation only in 1875 and 1876 and was rejected by the public for its similarity to the quarter dollar. The Western United States was not fully supplied with small change until the Mint began striking cents there in 1908 and five-cent nickels in 1912. The Trade dollar, struck principally to compete with Mexican dollars in the Far East trade, failed to gain full acceptance in the Orient. Many were returned to (or never left) the United States. As they could be purchased at a discount, they were popular among employers, who placed them in workers' pay packets. In 1876, Congress revoked even the limited legal tender status they enjoyed; in 1878, the Mint stopped striking them except for collectors, and even that limited issue ceased after 1885. In 1887, Congress allowed a six-month window during which they could be redeemed for other currency, provided they had not been chopmarked by Asian merchants.

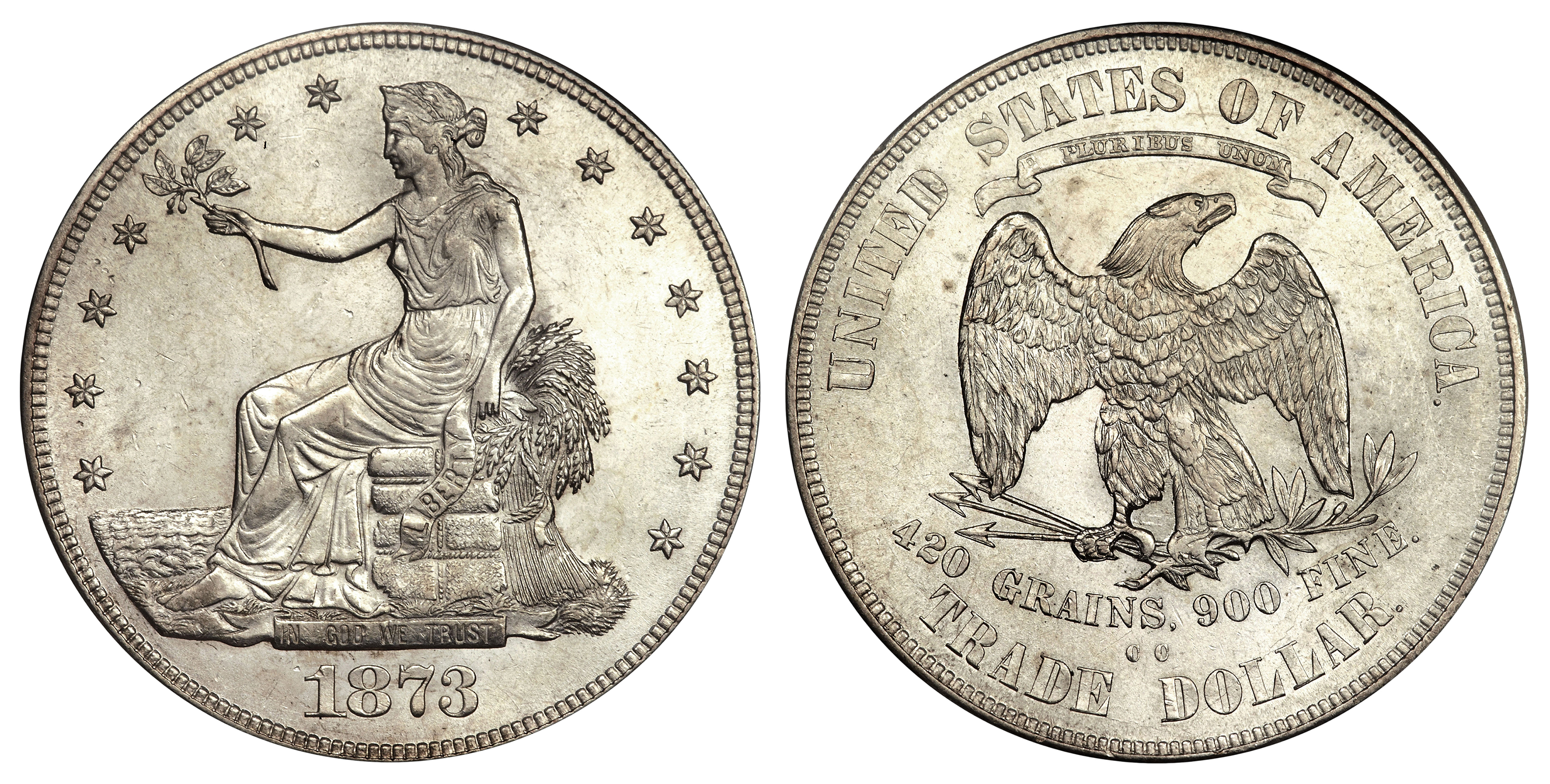
The Trade dollar, intended for use in the Far East, became controversial when circulated in the U.S.

As Friedman noted, if the price of silver had remained high, the exclusion of the silver dollar from the 1873 act would have been irrelevant. By 1874, the effect of the new mines in the Far West, and the sale of silver in Germany following its demonetization there, combined to force the price of silver down. Silver producers had not been aware of the statutory change, and only learned of it when they sought to present silver at the mints for coining. According to numismatic historian Don Taxay, "an agitation followed, during which several pious Congressmen feigned ignorance of the repeal, maintaining it had been worked into the Mint bill surreptitiously." One Delaware manufacturer wrote to his senator, Thomas F. Bayard, in 1878, "at the beginning ... I was totally ignorant of all that related to the silver question—so much in fact that (I find now like almost everyone else not excluding Congressmen!) I did not know Silver had been demonetized."

A severe depression, the Panic of 1873, began in the same year as passage of the act, and persisted for much of the decade. Many in the United States came to believe the gold standard too rigid to deal with economic hard times like those, and sought to restore bimetallism. The inflation caused by such a policy would enable debtors to repay what they owed more easily. The price of silver continued to fall—the silver in a dollar in the new metric-weight subsidiary silver coins was worth only $.75 by mid-1876, though the price recovered some after that.

In early 1875, Congress passed a bill for the resumption of specie payments (that is, in gold and silver coin)—effective in 1879. Friedman stated that had it not been for the 1873 act, resumption would have been on the effective basis of a silver standard, which he viewed as a good thing, allowing for more economic stability and "almost surely would have avoided" the downturn of the early 1890s known as the Panic of 1893.

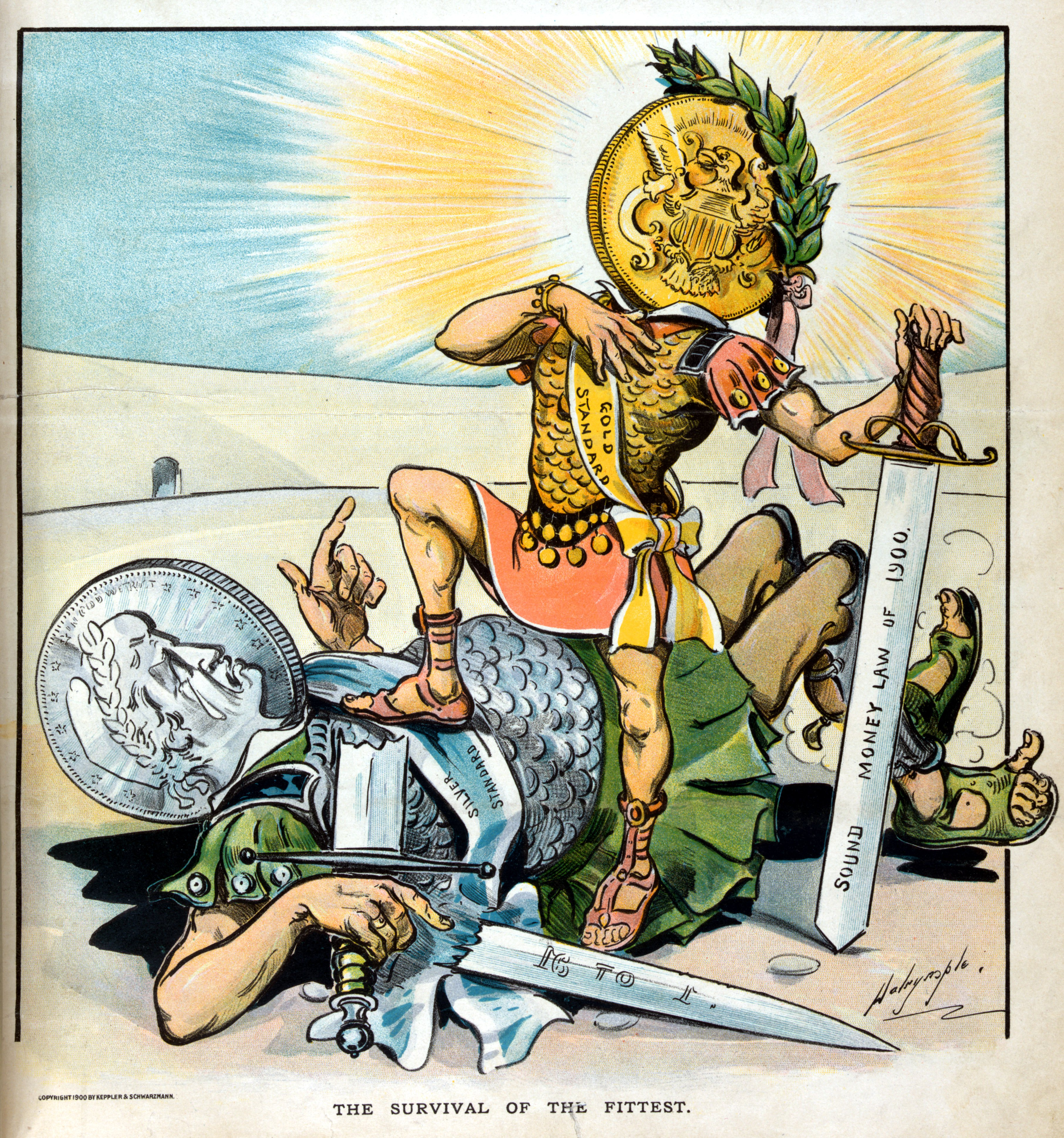
The gold standard triumphant: a caricature from Puck magazine, 1900

Support for bimetallism grew in the 1870s, and resulted in the passage of the Bland–Allison Act of February 28, 1878, over the veto of President Rutherford B. Hayes. This legislation required the Treasury to purchase millions of dollars' worth of silver bullion each month, and coin it into silver dollars. The denomination was restored as a legal tender, except when gold was specified by law or private contract. Renewed support for silver led to the passage of the Sherman Silver Purchase Act of 1890, greatly increasing the silver purchases, and requiring the Treasury to pay for them in banknotes that could be redeemed for gold. Over the next three years, $132,000,000 in gold was withdrawn from the Treasury, and amid another depression President Grover Cleveland secured the repeal of the silver purchase act.

The free silver movement reached its height with the 1896 campaign of former Nebraska representative William Jennings Bryan, who won the Democratic nomination for president after his Cross of Gold speech, which decried the gold standard, electrified the 1896 Democratic National Convention. Bryan was defeated in the election by former Ohio governor William McKinley, and in 1900, Congress passed the Gold Standard Act, placing that standard into law. The gold standard was departed from for many purposes by President Franklin Delano Roosevelt's New Deal administration, and completely ended by President Richard Nixon in 1971.

=== "Crime of '73" ===
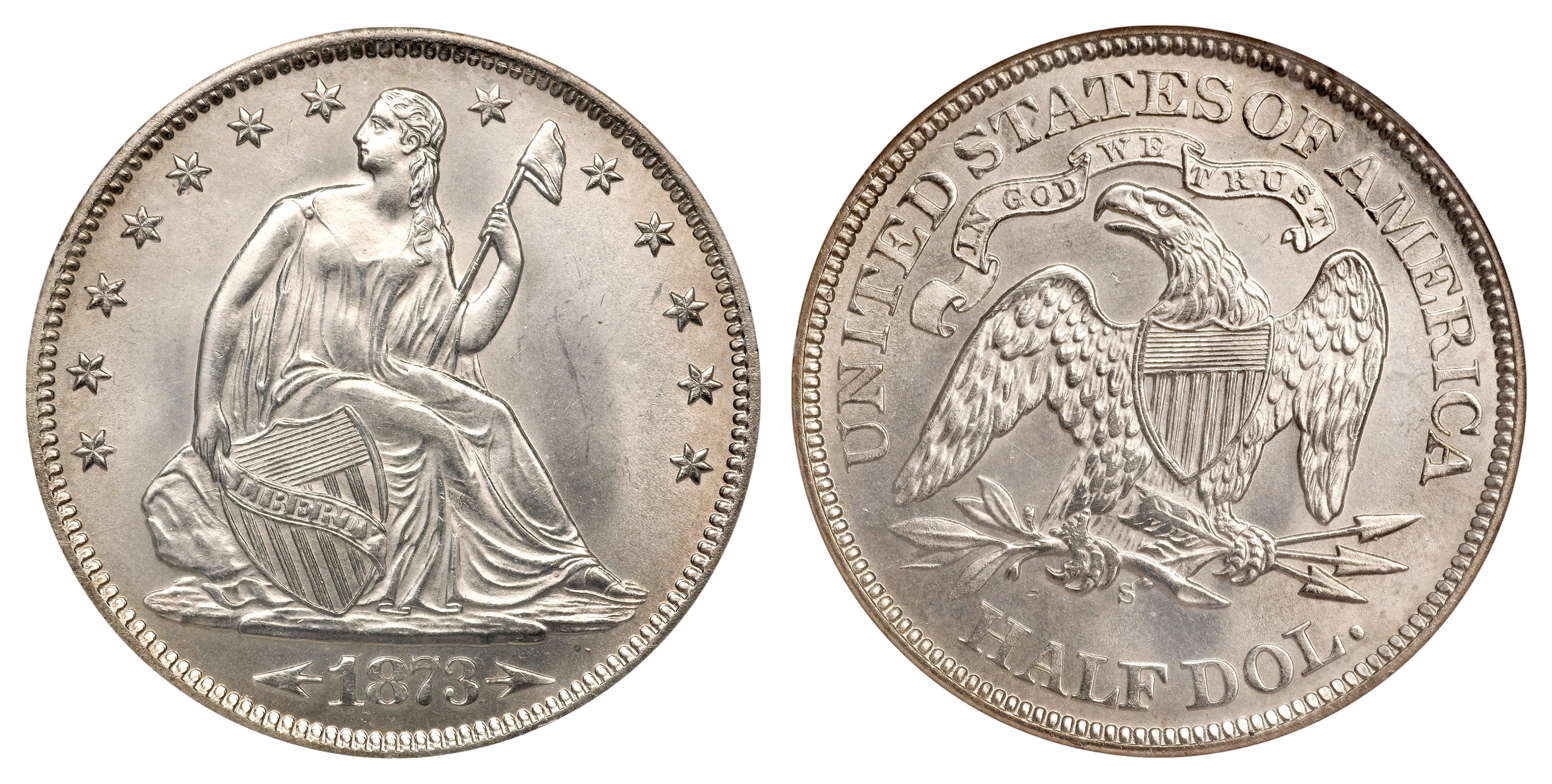
The arrows by the date of this half dollar show that it is one made after the Coinage Act increased its weight to 12.5 grams.

The Atlanta Constitution on April 1, 1873, reported the passage of the Coinage Act. It noted the abolition of the two-cent piece and the authorization of the Trade dollar, but did not mention the ending of the standard silver dollar. There was no widespread objection to the 1873 act until 1876. Several factors combined to bring forth protest then: tight money policies by the Treasury in preparation for the resumption of specie payments, a more precipitous drop in the price of silver than had hitherto been the case, and widespread use of Trade dollars after their rejection in the Chinese market. At the same time, the Comstock Lode and other Western mining areas were producing record amounts of silver. With a depression still ongoing, silver began to be seen as a means of inflating the currency and stimulating the economy.

Beginning in March 1876, former newspaper editor George Weston published letters asserting that bimetallism was mandated by the Constitution, and questioning how the Coinage Act had passed. Sympathetic newspapers began to suggest that the legislation had been enacted through corruption for the benefit of wealthy capitalists. On August 5, 1876, Missouri Congressman Richard P. Bland (soon to be known as "Silver Dick") told the House of Representatives, "The act of February 12, 1873 was a fraud, because its title gave no clue to the real intent of the act. The record shows that the act was stealthily passed, without reconsideration and without debate." In 1878, Congressman Kelley, who had introduced the bill into the House, stated, "I was ignorant of the fact it would demonetize the silver dollar".

Often blamed by those who deemed the act a crime was British financial writer Ernest Seyd, who had given advice as to the text of the bill, as attested by Congressman Hooper on the House floor in 1872. Seyd, according to this theory, was the agent of a group of British holders of American bonds, who had sent Seyd to America with £100,000 (then about $550,000) to bribe congressmen into demonetizing silver. Kelley denied this had taken place, but the story stuck, and became a common belief in the silver movement. In 1890, Seyd's corrupt involvement was asserted on the floor of the House of Representatives by Arkansas's Thomas C. McRae. Seyd was in fact an ardent bimetallist who strongly objected to the American demonetization of silver. He had submitted, at Hooper's request, an analysis of the bill in the course of which he advocated retaining the silver dollar as a legal tender.

The earliest use of the phrase "Crime of 1873" in congressional debate was by Colorado Senator Henry M. Teller, who on July 10, 1890, stated, "the fight for free coinage [of silver] is on, and it will stay on, too, till the will of the people shall be heard in the enactment of a law that shall put silver back where it belongs and where it would have been but for the blunder or the crime of 1873". The act had long been referred to as a "crime" without the exact phrase being used; in one 1889 speech, Nevada Senator William M. Stewart called it a "crime" seven times. He had voted for it in 1873.

== See also ==
- Coinage Act of 1834
- Coinage Act of 1849
- Coinage Act of 1853
- Coinage Act of 1857
- Coinage Act of 1864
- Coinage Act of 1965
- Alexander del Mar

== Sources ==
- Barnett, Paul (July 1964). "The Crime of 1873 Re-Examined". Agricultural History. 38 (3). Agricultural History Society: 178–181. JSTOR 3740438.
- Breen, Walter (1988). Walter Breen's Complete Encyclopedia of U.S. and Colonial Coins. New York, N.Y.: Doubleday. ISBN 978-0-385-14207-6. OL 4404444M.
- Bureau of the Mint (1904). Laws of the United States Relating to the Coinage. Washington, DC: United States Government Printing Office.
- Carothers, Neil (1930). Fractional Money: A History of Small Coins and Fractional Paper Currency of the United States. New York: John Wiley & Sons, Inc. (reprinted 1988 by Bowers and Merena Galleries, Inc., Wolfeboro, NH). ISBN 0-943161-12-6.
- Coin World Almanac (8th ed.). Sidney, OH: Amos Press. 2011. ISBN 978-0-944945-60-5.
- Friedman, Milton (December 1990). "The Crime of 1873". Journal of Political Economy. 98 (6). The University of Chicago Press: 1159–1194. doi:10.1086/261730. JSTOR 2937754. S2CID 153940661.
- Lange, David W. (2006). History of the United States Mint and its Coinage. Atlanta, GA: Whitman Publishing. ISBN 978-0-7948-1972-9.
- Nugent, Walter T. K. (1968). Money and American Society, 1865–1880. New York: Free Press. OCLC 180948.
- Pessolano-Filos, Francis (1983). Margaret M. Walsh (ed.). The Assay Medals and the Assay Commissions, 1841–1977. New York: Eros Publishing Company. ISBN 978-0-911571-01-1.
- Taxay, Don (1983). The U.S. Mint and Coinage (reprint of 1966 ed.). New York: Sanford J. Durst Numismatic Publications. ISBN 978-0-915262-68-7.
- Van Ryzin, Robert R. (2001). Crime of 1873: The Comstock Connection. Iola, WI: Krause Publications. ISBN 978-0-87341-873-7.
- Weinstein, Allen (September 1967). "Was There a "Crime of 1873"?: The Case of the Demonetized Dollar". The Journal of American History. 54 (2). Organization of American Historians: 307–326. doi:10.2307/1894808. JSTOR 1894808.
