= Ernest Seyd =

Ernest Seyd (March 7, 1830 – May 1, 1881) is a German-born British writer, banker, and economist, known for his expertise in coinage and foreign exchange, and for his advocacy of bimetallism.

== Biography ==
Ernest Seyd was born at Elberfeld in Prussia. At an early age he visited the United States, and subsequently went to Paris, and was present during the revolution of 1848. Returning the next year to Germany, he took an active part in the revolutionary movement which resulted in the Frankfurt Parliament and the Frankfurt Constitution. He was afterwards engaged in banking and exchange business in Paris, San Francisco, and London. On the adoption of the gold standard by Germany in 1873, he protested in the strongest manner against the change to a single gold standard, and "foresaw with wonderful prescience the monetary dislocations that have since taken place".

Seyd was also asked by the United States Congress to report on the American Coinage Bill of 1873 then pending. Seyd's writings on banking, bullion operations, and kindred subjects were well known, and his persistent advocacy of the use of silver as a standard, and his opposition to the policy of demonetisation of that metal, constitute him a leading, if not the principal pioneer of the nineteenth-century "bimetallic" movement in England.

Ernest J. F. Seyd, the son of Ernest Seyd, was the author of Bi-metallism in 1886 and the Further Fall in Silver and The Silver Question in 1893.

== The “Crime of 1873” hoax ==
In 1877, a story started circulating that Seyd had bribed Congress to pass the Coinage Act of 1873, which discontinued the minting of silver dollars. The Ohio Democrat explained the situation to its rival newspaper, the Canton Repository:

Well, Mr. Repository, let us see; here is the “evidence:”

“Congressional Record, 1872, April 9, page 2034, Mr. Hooper, Chairman of the Committee of Coinage, in his reports, states: 'Ernest Seyd, of London, a distinguished writer and bullionist, who is now here and has given great attention to the subject of mints and coinage, after examining the first draft of this bill made various sensible suggestions, which the Committee adopted and embodied in this bill.'

In 1872, silver being demonetized in France, Germany, England and Holland, a capital of £100,000 ($500,000) was raised, and Ernest Seyd, of London, was sent to this country with this fund as the agent of the foreign bondholders and capitalists, to effect the same object, which was successful.— Bankers' Magazine, August 1873”

Perhaps our friend of the Repository will question the evidence, if so, let him turn to the Congressional Record and read for himself.

By 1890, the alleged plot had been termed the “Crime of 1873”. In 1892, the case was bolstered when Frederick A. Luckenbach gave an affidavit that, when Luckenbach had dined with Seyd in 1874, Seyd had told him just that story. At the time, Luckenbach was selling mining equipment to silver miners in Colorado. The president of the State Silver League persuaded him to give the affidavit about what Seyd allegedly told him.

Congress investigated the story in 1893, twenty years after the alleged crime. It turned out that there was never any such story in Banker's Magazine and that the excerpt from the Congressional Globe (the predecessor to the Congressional Record) had been altered: Hooper did not say that Seyd was “now here” and he did not call him a bullionist. The original read:

Mr. Ernest Seyd, of London, a distinguished writer, who has given great attention to the subject of mints and coinage, after examining the first draft of the bill, furnished many valuable suggestions which have been incorporated in this bill.

Although Seyd and Hooper were long since dead, the letter that Seyd had written to Hooper was found and published. The letter contained page after page of technical recommendations, followed by an impassioned plea for keeping the silver dollar—exactly the opposite of what had been insinuated. Seyd, as it turned out, had been one of the foremost advocates of silver in England, and an expert on bimetallism. Seyd advocated for silver in all his works and had been consulted on the coinage bill because he had written a 250-page book, Suggestions in reference to the metallic currency of the United States. Congressmen distanced themselves from the story and even issued formal apologies for their allegations.

Writers pointed out numerous problems with Luckenbach's affidavit and with the story of the bribery. Perhaps the most glaring question was stated this way, by Hermon Wilson Craven:

The bill dropping the silver dollar from our list of coins had passed the senate on January 10, 1871, by a vote of 36 to 14. It had passed the house on May 27, 1872, by a vote of 110 to 13. In the name of common sense, what need was there for English and German bankers to send Seyd here in the winter of 1872-3, to bribe congress to favor a measure that had already passed both houses of congress without a word of opposition from a single member? Granting that bankers are as willing to resort to bribery as Populists claim—and the word of those who forge government reports would, of course, be accepted as conclusive on this point—they should be credited with having sense enough not to use bribery when there is no necessity whatever for it.

== Principal works ==
- California and its Resources. London: Trübner. 1858. OCLC 938349.
- Bullion and Foreign Exchanges Theoretically and Practically Considered. London: Royal exchange. 1868. OCLC 43890265.
- The Question of Seignorage and Charge for Coining. London: Wilson. 1868. OCLC 29766053.
- The depreciation of labour and property which would follow the demonetisation of silver. London: E. Wilson. 1869. OCLC 778047681.
- Speeches, letters, articles, &c. on the gold coinage controversy of 1869. Bank of England. 1869. OCLC 20338611.
- Die Münz-Währungs und Bankfragen in Deutschland. Elberfled: Druck und in Commission der Bäderker'schen Buch- u. Kunst-Handlung. 1871. OCLC 7482039.
- Suggestions in reference to the metallic currency of the United States. London: Trübner. 1871. OCLC 7262411.
- The London Banking and Bankers Clearing House System. London: Cassell, Petter and Galpin. 1872. OCLC 8838159.
- Reform of the Bank of England Note Issue. London: Harrison and Sons. 1873. p. 1. OCLC 12956324.
- The Decline of Prosperity; its Insidious Cause and Obvious Remedy. London: E. Stanford. 1879. OCLC 8392509.
