= Gold Standard Act =

1900 U.S. legislation which established gold as the standard for the U.S. dollar

- Long title: An Act to define and fix the standard of value, to maintain the parity of all forms of money issued or coined by the United States, to refund the public debt, and for other purposes.
- Nicknames: Gold Standard Act of 1900
- Enacted by: the 56th United States Congress
- Effective: March 14, 1900

Citations
- Public law: Pub. L. 56–41
- Statutes at Large: 31 Stat. 45

Legislative history
- Introduced in the House as H.R. 1; Passed the House on December 18, 1899 (192–152); Reported by the joint conference committee on March 6, 1900; agreed to by the Senate on March 6, 1900 (44–26) and by the House on March 13, 1900 (172–127); Signed into law by President William McKinley on March 14, 1900

The Gold Standard Act was an Act of the United States Congress, signed by President William McKinley and effective on March 14, 1900, defining the United States dollar by gold weight and requiring the United States Treasury to redeem, on demand and in gold coin only, paper currency the Act specified.

The Act formalized the American gold standard that the Coinage Act of 1873, which demonetized silver, and the Resumption Act of 1875, which made all legal tender notes redeemable in gold at the Treasury, had established by default. Before and after the Act, silver currency including silver certificates and the silver dollar circulated at face value as fiat currency not redeemable for gold.

The Act fixed the value of one dollar at 25.8 grains of 90% pure gold, equivalent to about $20.67 per troy ounce, very near its historic value. American circulating gold coins of the period comprised an alloy of 90% gold and 10% copper for durability. After the realigning 1932 United States elections following the onset of the Great Depression, the gold standard was abandoned from March 1933, and the Act abrogated, by a coordinated series of policy changes including executive orders by President Franklin D. Roosevelt, new laws, and U.S. Supreme Court rulings known as the Gold Clause Cases narrowly upheld the Roosevelt administration's policies.

After World War II international agreements comprising the Bretton Woods system formally restored foreign central banks' ability to exchange United States dollars for gold at a fixed price. World trade growth increasingly stressed this system, which was abandoned in the Nixon shock of 1971. Attempts to reform the Bretton Woods system quickly proved unworkable and failed. All modern currencies thus became fiat currencies freely floating and subject to market forces despite capital controls imposed by some central banks, with gold as a commodity.

== See also ==
- Bland–Allison Act (1878)
- Double eagle, one of a variety of U.S. gold coins minted in dollar units at $20.67/ounce
- Sherman Silver Purchase Act (1890)
- Specie Payment Resumption Act (1875)
