= 1816 in the United Kingdom =

Events from the year 1816 in the United Kingdom.

== Incumbents ==
- Monarch – George III
- Regent – George, Prince Regent
- Prime Minister – Robert Jenkinson, 2nd Earl of Liverpool (Tory)
- Foreign Secretary – Robert Stewart, Viscount Castlereagh
- Home Secretary – Lord Sidmouth
- Secretary of War – Lord Bathurst

== Events ==
- 9 January – Sir Humphry Davy's Davy lamp is first tested underground as a coal mining safety lamp at Hebburn Colliery in the Durham Coalfield.
- 30 January – Wrecking of the Sea Horse, Boadicea and Lord Melville (military transport ships) off the coast of Ireland in a gale with the loss of around 570.
- 20 February – Preston becomes the first English town outside London with gas lighting publicly available, promoted by the Jesuit priest Joseph Dunn.
- 18 March – Income tax abolished.
- 24 April – Lord Byron flees Britain to escape a growing scandal, his failed marriage and his growing debts.
- 2 May – Leopold of Saxe-Coburg (later King of the Belgians) marries Princess Charlotte Augusta, daughter of the Prince Regent, but she dies the following year.
- 16 May – Beau Brummell flees England by way of the port of Dover, sailing to France in order to escape his gambling debts.
- 22 May – Littleport and Ely riots break out as a result of economic distress in East Anglia.
- 14 June – Society for the Promotion of Permanent and Universal Peace established in London.
- 18 June – A riot breaks out on Wimbledon Common after inaccurate newspaper reports that a military review will commemorate the first anniversary of the Battle of Waterloo. After a drunken crowd sets fire to the heath, cavalry are called in to disperse them.
- 26 June – First prisoners admitted to the National Penitentiary, Millbank Prison, in London.
- 28 June – Luddites destroy the bobbinet lace machines in John Heathcoat's Loughborough factory.
- 13 August – An earthquake in Aberdeen is the strongest ever in Scotland.
- 27 August – Britain and the Netherlands bombard Algiers in an attempt to suppress slavery by the North African Barbary states.
- 23–27 October – Completion of the Leeds and Liverpool Canal.
- 10 November – Troop transport Harpooner, returning from Quebec to Britain, is wrecked at Cape Pine on Newfoundland (island) with the loss of 208 of the 385 people on board.
- 2 December – Spa Fields riots: a mass meeting of conspirators dispersed by the police.

=== Unknown dates ===
- The Coinage Act and Great Recoinage attempt to stabilise the currency by reintroduction of a silver coinage (for transactions under forty shillings) and changing the gold coinage from the guinea valued at 21 shillings to the slightly lighter sovereign worth 20 shillings and defining the value of the pound sterling relative to gold.
- By the Pillory Abolition Act, use of the pillory is limited to punishment for perjury.
- The British found Banjul, The Gambia.
- A British expedition explores up from the mouth of the Congo River.
- The Elgin Marbles are purchased by the nation from Thomas Bruce, 7th Earl of Elgin, for the British Museum.
- The Nelson Monument, Edinburgh, on Calton Hill, is completed.
- Year Without a Summer.

== Publications ==
- The Prisoner of Chillon, and other poems, by Lord Byron.
- Kubla Khan, poem by Samuel Taylor Coleridge.
- "On First Looking into Chapman's Homer", sonnet by John Keats.
- Glenarvon, novel by Lady Caroline Lamb.
- The Antiquary, The Black Dwarf and Old Mortality, novels by Walter Scott.

== Births ==
- 3 February – Frederick William Robertson, Anglican preacher (died 1853)
- 22 February – Thomas Gambier Parry, fresco painter and art collector (died 1888)
- 17 April – Thomas Hazlehurst, chemical manufacturer and Methodist chapel builder (died 1876)
- 21 April – Charlotte Brontë, English novelist and poet (died 1855)
- 29 April – (Charles William) Shirley Brooks, journalist (died 1874)
- 30 June – Richard Lindon, developer of the rugby ball (died 1887)
- 16 August – Charles Vaughan, Dean of Llandaff and co-founder of University of Wales, Cardiff (died 1897)

== Deaths ==
- 5 January – George Prevost, general, colonial administrator (born 1767 in British North America)
- 27 January – Viscount Hood, admiral (born 1724)
- 22 February – Adam Ferguson, Scottish Enlightenment philosopher and historian (born 1723)
- 5 July – Dorothea Jordan, actress, mistress of King William IV, died in France (born 1761 in Ireland)
- 7 July – Richard Brinsley Sheridan, playwright (born 1751 in Ireland)
- 22 September – Sir Robert Gunning, 1st Baronet, diplomat (born 1731)
- 27 September – Edward Charles Howard, chemical engineer (born 1774)
- 15 December – Charles Stanhope, 3rd Earl Stanhope, statesman and scientist (born 1753)
