= Mint Act =

Mint Act may refer to:

- The United States Coinage Act of 1792, which established the US dollar
- The United Kingdom Mint Act 1817
- The United Kingdom Coinage Act 1870
- The United States Coinage Act of 1873, a revision of currency laws
