= List of acts of the Parliament of Great Britain from 1774 =

This is a complete list of acts of the Parliament of Great Britain for the year 1774.

For acts passed until 1707, see the list of acts of the Parliament of England and the list of acts of the Parliament of Scotland. See also the list of acts of the Parliament of Ireland.

For acts passed from 1801 onwards, see the list of acts of the Parliament of the United Kingdom. For acts of the devolved parliaments and assemblies in the United Kingdom, see the list of acts of the Scottish Parliament, the list of acts of the Northern Ireland Assembly, and the list of acts and measures of Senedd Cymru; see also the list of acts of the Parliament of Northern Ireland.

The number shown after each act's title is its chapter number. Acts are cited using this number, preceded by the year(s) of the reign during which the relevant parliamentary session was held; thus the Union with Ireland Act 1800 is cited as "39 & 40 Geo. 3. c. 67", meaning the 67th act passed during the session that started in the 39th year of the reign of George III and which finished in the 40th year of that reign. Note that the modern convention is to use Arabic numerals in citations (thus "41 Geo. 3" rather than "41 Geo. III"). Acts of the last session of the Parliament of Great Britain and the first session of the Parliament of the United Kingdom are both cited as "41 Geo. 3".

Acts passed by the Parliament of Great Britain did not have a short title; however, some of these acts have subsequently been given a short title by acts of the Parliament of the United Kingdom (such as the Short Titles Act 1896).

Before the Acts of Parliament (Commencement) Act 1793 came into force on 8 April 1793, acts passed by the Parliament of Great Britain were deemed to have come into effect on the first day of the session in which they were passed. Because of this, the years given in the list below may in fact be the year before a particular act was passed.

== 14 Geo. 3 ==
The seventh session of the 13th Parliament of Great Britain, which met from 13 January 1774 until 22 June 1774.

This session was also traditionally cited as 14 G. 3.

=== Public acts ===
Short title	Citation	Royal assent
Long title
Land Tax Act 1774 (repealed)	14 Geo. 3. c. 1	10 February 1774
An Act for granting an Aid to His Majesty by a Land Tax, to be raised in Great Britain, for the Service of the Year One thousand seven hundred and seventy-four. (Repealed by Statute Law Revision Act 1871 (34 & 35 Vict. c. 116))
Malt Duties Act 1774 (repealed)	14 Geo. 3. c. 2	10 February 1774
An Act for continuing and granting to. His Majesty certain Duties upon Malt, Mum, Cyder, and Perry, for the Service of the Year One thousand seven hundred and seventy-four. (Repealed by Statute Law Revision Act 1871 (34 & 35 Vict. c. 116))
Mutiny Act 1774 (repealed)	14 Geo. 3. c. 3	10 February 1774
An Act for punishing Mutiny and Desertion, and for the better Payment of the Army and their Quarters. (Repealed by Statute Law Revision Act 1871 (34 & 35 Vict. c. 116))
Marine Mutiny Act 1774 (repealed)	14 Geo. 3. c. 4	9 March 1774
An Act for the Regulation of His Majesty’s Marine Forces while on Shore. (Repealed by Statute Law Revision Act 1871 (34 & 35 Vict. c. 116))
Exportation Act 1774 (repealed)	14 Geo. 3. c. 5	9 March 1774
An Act to allow the Exportation of Corn, Grain, and other Articles, to His Majesty's Sugar Colonies in America; and to extend the Provisions of an Act, made in the last Session of Parliament, intituled, "An Act to regulate the importation and Exportation of Corn," (Note: Corn Act 1772 (13 Geo. 3. c. 43)) allowing the Exportation of Wheat, Meal, Flour, Rye, Barley, or Malt, to the Islands of Guernsey and Jersey, to Bread, Biscuit, and Pease; and to allow the Exportation of all the said Articles to the Island of Alderney. (Repealed by Statute Law Revision Act 1871 (34 & 35 Vict. c. 116))
Mutiny in America Act 1774 (repealed)	14 Geo. 3. c. 6	9 March 1774
An Act for further continuing Two Acts, made in the Sixth (Note: Mutiny in America Act 1766 (6 Geo. 3. c. 18)) and Ninth (Note: Mutiny in America Act 1769 (9 Geo. 3. c. 18)) Years of His Majesty's Reign, for punishing Mutiny and Desertion; and for the better Payment of the Army and their Quarters, in His Majesty’s Dominions in America. (Repealed by Statute Law Revision Act 1871 (34 & 35 Vict. c. 116))
Cardiff (Improvement) Act 1774 (repealed)	14 Geo. 3. c. 7	9 March 1774
An Act for better paving, cleansing, and lighting, the Streets, Lanes, and Publick Passages, in the Town of Cardiff, and Liberties thereof, in the County of Glamorgan, and for removing and preventing Nuisances and Annoyances therein. (Repealed by Cardiff Improvement Act 1837 (7 Will. 4 & 1 Vict. c. xviii))
Plymouth (Streets) Act 1774 (repealed)	14 Geo. 3. c. 8	9 March 1774
An Act to explain and amend Two Acts, made in the Tenth (Note: Plymouth Improvement Act 1770 (10 Geo. 3. c. 14)) and Twelfth (Note: Plymouth (Improvement) Act 1772 (12 Geo. 3. c. 8)) Years of His present Majesty's Reign, for paving, lighting, and watching, the Town of Plymouth, in the County of Devon; and for regulating the Carmen and Porters within the said Town. (Repealed by Plymouth Improvement Act 1824 (5 Geo. 4. c. xxii))
Importation Act 1774 (repealed)	14 Geo. 3. c. 9	9 March 1774
An Act to continue for a further Time an Act, made in the Eighth Year of His present Majesty's Reign, (Note: Importation Act 1768 (8 Geo. 3. c. 9)) intituled, "An Act to continue and amend an Act, made in the Fifth Year of the Reign of His present Majesty, (Note: Importation Act 1765 (5 Geo. 3. c. 1)) intituled, 'An Act for Importation of Salted Beef, Pork, Bacon, and Butter, from Ireland, for a limited Time; and for allowing the Importation of Salted Beef, Pork, Bacon, and Butter, from the British Dominions in America, for a limited Time.'" (Repealed by Statute Law Revision Act 1871 (34 & 35 Vict. c. 116))
Exportation (No. 2) Act 1774 (repealed)	14 Geo. 3. c. 10	9 March 1774
An Act for reducing the Duty payable upon the Exportation of Gum Senegal, granted by an Act, made in the Fifth Year of the Reign of His present Majesty, intituled, "An Act for laying certain Duties upon Gum Senegal and Gum Arabic, imported into or exported from Great Britain, and for confining the Exportation of Gum Senegal from Africa to Great Britain only." (Note: Customs Act 1765 (5 Geo. 3. c. 37)) (Repealed by Statute Law Revision Act 1861 (24 & 25 Vict. c. 101))
Exportation (No. 3) Act 1774 (repealed)	14 Geo. 3. c. 11	9 March 1774
An Act to allow the Exportation of a limited Quantity of Biscuit and Pease to the Island of Newfoundland, for the Benefit of the British Fishery there. (Repealed by Statute Law Revision Act 1871 (34 & 35 Vict. c. 116))
Clapham Church Act 1774 (repealed)	14 Geo. 3. c. 12	9 March 1774
An Act for vesting a Piece of Waste Ground within, and Parcel of, the Manor of Clapham, in the County of Surry, in Trustees, and for enabling them to build a new Parish Church thereon. (Repealed by London Government (Borough of Wandsworth) Order in Council 1901 (SR&O 1901/222))
Calder Canal Act 1774	14 Geo. 3. c. 13	9 March 1774
An Act for enabling Sir John Ramsden Baronet, to make and maintain a navigable Canal, from the River Colder (between a Bridge called Cooper's Bridge and the Mouth of the River Colne) to The King’s Mill, near the Town of Huddersfield, in the West Riding of the County of York.
Turnpike Roads Act 1774 (repealed)	14 Geo. 3. c. 14	31 March 1774
An Act to repeal a Clause in an Act, made in the Thirteenth Year of His present Majesty's Reign, intituled, "An Act to explain, amend, and reduce into One Act of Parliament, the General Laws now in being for regulating the Turnpike Roads in that Part of Great Britain called England, and for other Purposes;" (Note: Turnpike Roads Act 1773 (13 Geo. 3. c. 84)) which regulates the Width of the Wheels, and the Length of Carriages liable to be weighed; and for indemnifying Persons who have offended against the said Clause. (Repealed by Turnpike Roads Act 1822 (3 Geo. 4. c. 126))
Parliamentary Elections Act 1774 (repealed)	14 Geo. 3. c. 15	31 March 1774
An Act for making perpetual Two Acts, passed in the Tenth (Note: Parliamentary Elections Act 1770 (10 Geo. 3. c. 16)) and Eleventh (Note: Parliamentary Elections Act 1771 (11 Geo. 3. c. 42)) Years of the Reign of His present Majesty, for regulating the Trials of Controverted Elections, or Returns of Members to serve in Parliament. (Repealed by Controverted Elections Act 1828 (9 Geo. 4. c. 22))
Fen Drainage Act 1774	14 Geo. 3. c. 16	31 March 1774
An Act for amending and rendering more effectual an Act, made in the Thirtieth Year of the Reign of His late Majesty King George the Second, intituled, "An Act for draining and preserving certain Fen Lands, Low Grounds, and Commons, in the Townships or Hamlets of March and Wimblington, and in the Parish of Upwell, in the Isle of Ely, and County of Cambridge," (Note: March, Cambridge, Isle of Ely Drainage Act 1757 (30 Geo. 2. c. 36)) so far as the same relates to the several Fen Lands and Low Grounds lying in the Sixth District, in the said Act described.
Land Tax (No. 2) Act 1774 (repealed)	14 Geo. 3. c. 17	31 March 1774
An Act for appointing Commissioners to put in Execution an Act of this Session of Parliament, intituled, "An Act for granting an Aid to His Majesty by a Land Tax, to be raised in Great Britain, for the Service of the Year One thousand seven hundred and seventy-four," (Note: Land Tax Act 1774 (14 Geo. 3. c. 1)) together with those named in Two former Acts for appointing Commissioners of the Land Tax. (Repealed by Statute Law Revision Act 1871 (34 & 35 Vict. c. 116))
Militia Pay Act 1774 (repealed)	14 Geo. 3. c. 18	31 March 1774
An Act for defraying the Charge of the Pay and Cloathing of the Militia in that Part of Great Britain called England, for One Year, beginning the Twenty-fifth Day of March One thousand seven hundred and seventy-four. (Repealed by Statute Law Revision Act 1871 (34 & 35 Vict. c. 116))
Trade Act 1774 or the Boston Port Act 1774 (repealed)	14 Geo. 3. c. 19	31 March 1774
An Act to discontinue, in such Manner and for such Time as are therein mentioned, the landing and discharging, lading or shipping, of Goods, Wares, and Merchandize, at the Town, and within the Harbour, of Boston, in the Province of Massachusetts Bay, in North America. (Repealed by Prohibitory Act 1776 (16 Geo. 3. c. 5))
Discharged Prisoners Act 1774 (repealed)	14 Geo. 3. c. 20	31 March 1774
An Act for the Relief of Prisoners charged with Felony, or other Crimes, who shall be acquitted or discharged by Proclamation, respecting the Payment of Fees to Gaolers, and giving a Recompence for such Fees out of the County Rates. (Repealed by Statute Law Revision Act 1871 (34 & 35 Vict. c. 116))
Bank of Ayr Act 1774 (repealed)	14 Geo. 3. c. 21	31 March 1774
An Act for more effectually carrying into Execution certain Proposals made by the Most Noble Henry Duke of Buccleugh, (Note: Henry Scott, 3rd Duke of Buccleuch.) the Most Noble Charles Duke of Queensberry and Dover, (Note: Charles Douglas, 3rd Duke of Queensberry.) and others, for redeeming the Annuities granted by the Company of the Bank of Ayr, in that Part of Great Britain called Scotland, known under the Firm of Douglas, Heron, and Company. (Repealed by Statute Law (Repeals) Act 1989 (c. 43))
Crown Lands (Forfeited Estates) Act 1774 (repealed)	14 Geo. 3. c. 22	31 March 1774
An Act to enable His Majesty to grant unto Major General Simon Fraser the Lands and Estate of the late Simon Lord Lovat, upon certain Terms and Conditions. (Repealed by Statute Law Revision Act 1948 (11 & 12 Geo. 6. c. 62))
Deeping Fens Act 1774 (repealed)	14 Geo. 3. c. 23	31 March 1774
An Act for amending and rendering more effectual several Acts of Parliament of the Sixteenth and Seventeenth, (Note: Draining Deeping Fen Act 1664 (16 & 17 Cha. 2. c. 11)) and Twenty-second (Note: Deeping Fen Act 1670 (22 Cha. 2. c. 14)) Years of King Charles the Second, and of the Eleventh Year of His late Majesty, (Note: Deeping Fen Drainage Act 1737 (11 Geo. 2. c. 39)) for draining and preserving certain Lands called Deeping Fens, in the County of Lincoln. (Repealed by Deeping Fen Drainage Act 1856 (19 & 20 Vict. c. lxv))
Clerkenwell (Streets) Act 1774 (repealed)	14 Geo. 3. c. 24	31 March 1774
An Act for paving, repairing, lighting, and watching, the Streets, and other Publick Passages and Places, within that Part of the Parish of Clerkenwell, called Saint James’s, and removing Obstructions and Annoyances therein; for widening the Passage from Clerkenwell Green to the Parish Church; and for watching and lighting certain Highways within the said Parish. (Repealed by London Government (Borough of Stepney) Order in Council 1901 (SR&O 1901/276))
Frauds, etc., in Woollen Manufacturers Act 1774 (repealed)	14 Geo. 3. c. 25	5 May 1774
An Act for the more effectual preventing Frauds and Embezzlements by Persons employed in the Woollen Manufactory. (Repealed by Master and Servant Act 1889 (52 & 53 Vict. c. 24))
Exportation (No. 4) Act 1774 (repealed)	14 Geo. 3. c. 26	5 May 1774
An Act to allow the Exportation of a limited Quantity of Wheat-meal or Flour, Oats, Oatmeal, Grotts, Barley, Pease, Beans, Malt, and Biscuit, to Hudson's Bay, in North America, for the Benefit of the Hudson’s Bay Company, and their Servants residing there. (Repealed by Statute Law Revision Act 1871 (34 & 35 Vict. c. 116))
Swansea (Improvement) Act 1774 (repealed)	14 Geo. 3. c. 27	5 May 1774
An Act for fixing and regulating a Publick Market and Shambles for the Sale of Meat within the Town and Borough of Swansea, in the County of Glamorgan. (Repealed by Swansea Municipal Corporation Act 1863 (26 & 27 Vict. c. xiii))
Kinghorn Beer Duties Act 1774 (repealed)	14 Geo. 3. c. 28	5 May 1774
An Act to continue an Act, made in the Twenty-second Year of the Reign of His late Majesty King George the Second, (Note: Kinghorn Beer Duties Act 1748 (22 Geo. 2. c. 13)) for laying a Duty of Two Pennies Scots, or One Sixth Part of a Penny Sterling, upon every Scots Pint of Ale and Beer which shall be brewed for Sale, brought into, tapped, or sold, within the Town of Kinghorn, and Liberties thereof. (Repealed by Statute Law Revision Act 1948 (11 & 12 Geo. 6. c. 62))
Shoreditch (Poor Relief) Act 1774 (repealed)	14 Geo. 3. c. 29	5 May 1774
An Act for the better Relief and Employment of the Poor within the Parish of Saint Leonard Shoreditch, in the County of Middlesex; and for building a Workhouse, and for purchasing a Piece of Land for a Burial Ground, for the Use of the said Parish. (Repealed by St. Leonard Shoreditch Improvement Act 1813 (53 Geo. 3. c. cxii))
Stepney (Streets) Act 1774 (repealed)	14 Geo. 3. c. 30	5 May 1774
An Act for providing a Workhouse, and for better governing, regulating, and maintaining, the Poor, within the Old Artillery Ground, in the Liberty of the Tower of London; and for paving, cleansing, lighting, and watching, the Streets, Lanes, and other Open Passages and Places, within the same; and for preventing Obstructions and Annoyances therein. (Repealed by London Government (Borough of Stepney) Order in Council 1901 (SR&O 1901/276))
Fife Roads and Bridges Act 1774 (repealed)	14 Geo. 3. c. 31	5 May 1774
An Act for repairing the Highways and Bridges in the County of Fife. (Repealed by Fife Roads Act 1797 (37 Geo. 3. c. 52))
Bank of Scotland Act 1774 (repealed)	14 Geo. 3. c. 32	5 May 1774
An Act to enable the Governor and Company of the Bank of Scotland to increase the Capital Stock of the said Company. (Repealed by Statute Law (Repeals) Act 1981 (c. 19))
Tetney, Lincolnshire (Inclosure) Act 1774	14 Geo. 3. c. 33	5 May 1774
An Act for dividing and enclosing the Open Fields, Meadows, Stinted Common Pastures, and other Common and Waste Lands and Grounds, in the Parish of Tetney, in the County of Lincoln; and for draining and improving Part of the said Parish.
East India Trade Act 1774 (repealed)	14 Geo. 3. c. 34	5 May 1774
An Act for granting further Time to the United Company of Merchants of England trading to the East Indies, to expose to Sale the Singlo and Bohea Teas remaining in their Warehouses unfold on the Fifth Day of April One thousand seven hundred and seventy-four; and for allowing the Drawbacks on the Exportation of such Teas. (Repealed by Statute Law Revision Act 1871 (34 & 35 Vict. c. 116))
Composition for a Crown Debt Act 1774 (repealed)	14 Geo. 3. c. 35	5 May 1774
An Act to enable the Commissioners for executing the Office of Treasurer of His Majesty's Exchequer, or the Lord High Treasurer for the Time being, to compound certain Debts due to His Majesty, and affecting the Estates heretofore of Charles Moson Esquire, deceased, in the Counties of Montgomery and Salop, and upon Payment of such Composition to discharge and exonerate the said Estates therefrom. (Repealed by Statute Law Revision Act 1948 (11 & 12 Geo. 6. c. 62))
Turnpike Roads (No. 2) Act 1774 (repealed)	14 Geo. 3. c. 36	20 May 1774
An Act to explain and amend an Act, made in the Thirteenth Year of His present Majesty’s Reign, intituled, "An Act to explain, amend, and reduce into One Act of Parliament, the general Laws now in being for regulating the Turnpike Roads in that Part of Great Britain called England; and for other Purposes;" so far as the same relates to the continuing and granting an additional Term of Five Years to Acts made for amending Turnpike Roads. (Repealed by Turnpike Roads Act 1822 (3 Geo. 4. c. 126))
Papists Act 1774 (repealed)	14 Geo. 3. c. 37	5 May 1774
An Act for allowing further Time for Enrolment of Deeds and Wills made by Papists, and for Relief of Protestant Purchasers. (Repealed by Statute Law Revision Act 1871 (34 & 35 Vict. c. 116))
Hereford Streets Act 1774 (repealed)	14 Geo. 3. c. 38	5 May 1774
An Act for paving, repairing, cleansing, and lighting, the Streets and Lanes in the City of Hereford, and Suburbs thereof, and removing Nuisances and Annoyances therein; and for creating a Fund towards the Expences thereof, by enclosing divers Waste Grounds within the Liberties of the said City; and for the better Application of Charity Money for setting the Poor People of the said City to work; and to enable Bodies Corporate to alienate their Houses and Lands within the said City. (Repealed by Hereford Improvement Act 1854 (17 & 18 Vict. c. xxxi))
Administration of Justice Act 1774 or the American Rebellion Act 1774 or the Monkey Act or the Murder Act (repealed)	14 Geo. 3. c. 39	20 May 1774
An Act for the impartial Administration of Justice in the Cases of Persons questioned for any Acts done by them in the Execution of the Law, or for the Suppression of Riots and Tumults in the Province of Massachusetts Bay, in New England. (Repealed by Statute Law Revision Act 1871 (34 & 35 Vict. c. 116))
Disposal of Ulysses Fitzmaurice's Intestate Estate Act 1774 (repealed)	14 Geo. 3. c. 40	5 May 1774
An Act for divesting out of the Crown the Plantation and Estate of Ulysses Fitzmaurice Esquire, deceased, and for vesting the same in Trustees, to be bold for Payment of his Debts; and for other Purposes therein mentioned. (Repealed by Statute Law Revision Act 1948 (11 & 12 Geo. 6. c. 62))
Free Ports (Jamaica) Act 1774 (repealed)	14 Geo. 3. c. 41	20 May 1774
An Act for further continuing so much of Two Acts, made in the Sixth (Note: Free Ports, West Indies, etc. Act 1766 (6 Geo. 3. c. 49)) and Thirteenth (Note: Importation and Exportation (No. 9) Act 1772 (13 Geo. 3. c. 73)) Years of the Reign of His present Majesty, as relates to the opening and establishing certain Free Ports in the Island of Jamaica. (Repealed by Statute Law Revision Act 1871 (34 & 35 Vict. c. 116))
Light Silver Coin Act 1774 (repealed)	14 Geo. 3. c. 42	20 May 1774
An Act to prohibit the Importation of light Silver Coin of this Realm from Foreign Countries into Great Britain or Ireland; and to restrain the Tender thereof beyond a certain Sum. (Repealed by Coin Act 1816 (56 Geo. 3. c. 68) and Customs Law Repeal Act 1825 (6 Geo. 4. c. 105))
Court of Chancery Act 1774 (repealed)	14 Geo. 3. c. 43	20 May 1774
An Act for rebuilding the Offices of the Six Clerks of the King's Court of Chancery; and for erecting Offices for the Register and Accountant General of the said Court, for the better preserving the Records, Decrees, Orders, and Books of Account, kept in such Offices. (Repealed by Courts of Justice (Salaries and Funds) Act 1869 (32 & 33 Vict. c. 91))
Reeling False or Short Yarn Act 1774 (repealed)	14 Geo. 3. c. 44	20 May 1774
An Act to amend an Act, made in the Twenty-second Year of the Reign of His late Majesty King George the Second, intituled, "An Act for the more effectual preventing of Frauds and Abuses committed by Persons employed in the Manufacture of Hats, and the Woollen, Linen, Fustian, Cotton, Iron, Leather, Fur, Hemp, Flax, Mohair, and Silk Manufactures; and for preventing unlawful Combinations of Journeymen Dyers and Journeymen Hot Pressers, and of all Persons employed in the said several Manufactures; and for the better Payment of their Wages." (Note: Frauds by Workmen Act 1748 (22 Geo. 2. c. 27)) (Repealed by Master and Servant Act 1889 (52 & 53 Vict. c. 24))
Massachusetts Government Act 1774 or the American Rebellion Act 1774 (repealed)	14 Geo. 3. c. 45	20 May 1774
An Act for the better regulating the Government of the Province of The Massachusetts Bay, in New England. (Repealed by Province of Massachusetts Bay Act 1778 (18 Geo. 3. c. 11))
Rewards for Apprehensions, Durham Act 1774 (repealed)	14 Geo. 3. c. 46	20 May 1774
An Act to enable the Commissioners for executing the Office of Treasurer of His Majesty’s Exchequer, or the Lord High Treasurer for the Time being, to pay out of the Revenue of the Crown certain Rewards for apprehending Highwaymen, and other Offenders, in the County Palatine of Durham. (Repealed by Statute Law Revision Act 1871 (34 & 35 Vict. c. 116))
Indemnity Act 1774 (repealed)	14 Geo. 3. c. 47	20 May 1774
An Act to indemnify such Persons as have omitted to qualify themselves for Offices and Employments; and to indemnify Justices of the Peace, or others, who have omitted to register or deliver in their Qualifications within the Time limited by Law, and for giving further Time for those Purposes; and to indemnify Members and Officers in Cities, Corporations, and Borough Towns, whose Admissions have been omitted to be stamped according to Law, or, having been stamped, have been lost or mislaid; and for allowing them Time to provide Admissions duly stamped; and to give further Time to such Persons as have omitted to make and file Affidavits of the Execution of Indentures of Clerks to Attornies and Solicitors. (Repealed by Promissory Oaths Act 1871 (34 & 35 Vict. c. 48))
Life Assurance Act 1774	14 Geo. 3. c. 48	20 May 1774
An Act for regulating Insurances upon Lives, and for prohibiting all such Insurances, except in Cases where the Persons insuring shall have an Interest in the Life or Death of the Persons insured.
Madhouses Act 1774 (repealed)	14 Geo. 3. c. 49	20 May 1774
An Act for regulating Madhouses. (Repealed by Statute Law Revision Act 1871 (34 & 35 Vict. c. 116))
Plymouth (Fortifications) Act 1774	14 Geo. 3. c. 50	20 May 1774
An Act to enable certain Persons, during the Minority of Sir John Saint Aubyn Baronet, to renew and grant Leases of Lands, and to sell other Lands, all at Plymouth Dock, in the County of Devon, for the Use of His Majesty, His Heirs and Successors.
Macclesfield Grammar School Act 1774	14 Geo. 3. c. 51	20 May 1774
An Act to confirm certain Sales and Purchases of Estates, made by the Governors of the Free Grammar School of King Edward the Sixth, in Macclesfield, in the County of Chester; to enable them to make other Sales, Purchases, and Exchanges; and to improve and extend the Benefits of the Foundation of the said School.
Grosvenor Square (Paving, etc.) Act 1774 (repealed)	14 Geo. 3. c. 52	20 May 1774
An Act to enable the Inhabitants of Grosvenor Square, in the County of Middlesex, to pave, cleanse, light, water, and embellish, the said Square; and for other Purposes therein mentioned. (Repealed by Grosvenor Square Improvement Act 1835 (5 & 6 Will. 4. c. xliii))
Bude Canal Act 1774	14 Geo. 3. c. 53	20 May 1774
An Act for making a navigable Cut or Canal from the Port or Harbour of Bude, in the Hundred of Stratton, in the County of Cornwall, to the River Tamer, in the Parish of Calstoke, in the said County.
Army Act 1774 (repealed)	14 Geo. 3. c. 54	2 June 1774
An Act for the better providing suitable Quarters for Officers and Soldiers in His Majesty's Service in North America. (Repealed by Statute Law Revision Act 1871 (34 & 35 Vict. c. 116))
Saint Stephen, Bristol Act 1774	14 Geo. 3. c. 55	20 May 1774
An Act for making commodious Ways and Passages within the Parish of Saint Stephen, in the City of Bristol, and for enlarging the Burying Ground belonging to the said Parish.
Kingston-upon-Hull Dock Act 1774 or the Kingston-upon-Hull Port Act 1774	14 Geo. 3. c. 56	20 May 1774
An Act for making and establishing publick Quays or Wharfs at Kingston upon Hull, for the better securing His Majesty's Revenues of Customs, and for the Benefit of Commerce in the Port of Kingston upon Hull; for making a Bason or Dock, with Reservoirs, Sluices, Roads, and other Works, for the Accommodation of Vessels using the said Port; and for appropriating certain Lands belonging to His Majesty, and for applying certain Sums of Money out of His Majesty's Customs at the said Port for those Purposes; and for establishing other necessary Regulations within the Town and Port of Kingston upon Hull.
Turnpikes Act 1774 (repealed)	14 Geo. 3. c. 57	2 June 1774
An Act to repeal so much of an Act made in the last Session of Parliament, for reducing into One Act the general Laws relating to Turnpike Roads, as exempts Persons from the Payment of Tolls at Side Gates, erected at Places specified in any Act of Parliament. (Repealed by Turnpike Roads Act 1822 (3 Geo. 4. c. 126))
Parliamentary Elections (No. 2) Act 1774 (repealed)	14 Geo. 3. c. 58	2 June 1774
An Act for repealing an Act made in the First Year of the Reign of King Henry the Fifth, (Note: Parliamentary Elections Act 1413 (1 Hen. 5. c. 1)) and so much of several Acts of the Eighth, (Note: Electors of Knights of the Shires Act 1429 (8 Hen. 6. c. 7)) Tenth, (Note: Electors of Knights of the Shire Act 1432 (10 Hen. 6. c. 2)) and Twenty-third (Note: Parliamentary Elections Act 1444 (23 Hen. 6. c. 14)) Years of King Henry the Sixth, as relates to the Residence of Persons to be elected Members to serve in Parliament, or of the Persons by whom they are to be chosen. (Repealed by Statute Law Revision Act 1871 (34 & 35 Vict. c. 116))
Health of Prisoners Act 1774 (repealed)	14 Geo. 3. c. 59	2 June 1774
An Act for preserving the Health of Prisoners in Gaol, and preventing the Gaol Distemper. (Repealed by Statute Law Revision Act 1871 (34 & 35 Vict. c. 116))
Indemnity of Innkeepers Act 1774 (repealed)	14 Geo. 3. c. 60	2 June 1774
An Act for indemnifying the Innkeepers and Victuallers within the Hundred of Godley, in the County of Surrey, against the Penalties to which they are or may be liable for selling Ale, Beer, Wine, or Spirituous Liquors, without proper Licences, upon certain Conditions. (Repealed by Statute Law Revision Act 1871 (34 & 35 Vict. c. 116))
Exeter (Poor Relief) Act 1774 (repealed)	14 Geo. 3. c. 61	20 May 1774
An Act to explain and amend Two several Acts of Parliament for erecting Hospitals and Workhouses within the City and County of the City of Exon; for the better employing and maintaining the Poor there; and to raise further Sums of Money for the more effectually carrying the Purposes of the said Acts into Execution. (Repealed by Local Government Board's Provisional Order Confirmation (No. 11) Act 1913 (3 & 4 Geo. 5. c. cxxxv))
Bloomsbury (Poor Relief) Act 1774 (repealed)	14 Geo. 3. c. 62	20 May 1774
An Act for better governing and employing the Poor, and making and collecting the Poor's Rates, within the Parishes of Saint Giles in the Fields and Saint George Bloomsbury, in the County of Middlesex. (Repealed by Parishes of St. Giles in the Fields and St. George Bloomsbury Act 1830 (11 Geo. 4. & 1 Will. 4. c. x))
Carlton Bridge, Yorkshire Act 1774	14 Geo. 3. c. 63	2 June 1774
An Act for building a Bridge cross the River Air, at Carlton, in the West Riding of the County of York.
Corn Act 1774 (repealed)	14 Geo. 3. c. 64	2 June 1774
An Act to explain so much of an Act, made in the last Session of Parliament, intituled, "An Act to regulate the Importation and Exportation of Corn," as relates to the Method of ascertaining the Prices of Corn and Grain exported. (Repealed by Statute Law Revision Act 1861 (24 & 25 Vict. c. 101))
Forfeited Estates (Scotland) Act 1774 (repealed)	14 Geo. 3. c. 65	2 June 1774
An Act to alter and amend an Act, passed in the Twenty-fifth Year of the Reign of His late Majesty King George the Second, intituled, "An Act for annexing certain forfeited Estates in Scotland to the Crown inalienably; and for making Satisfaction to the lawful Creditors thereupon; and to establish a Method of managing the same, and applying the Rents and Profits thereof, for the better civilizing and improving the Highlands of Scotland; and preventing Disorders there for the future," (Note: Crown Lands (Forfeited Estates) Act 1751 (25 Geo. 2. c. 41)) so far as the same relates to the granting Leases of the said Estates. (Repealed by Statute Law Revision Act 1861 (24 & 25 Vict. c. 101))
Discovery of Longitude at Sea Act 1774 (repealed)	14 Geo. 3. c. 66	2 June 1774
An Act for the Repeal of all former Acts concerning the Longitude at Sea, except so much thereof as relates to the Appointment and Authority of the Commissioners thereby constituted, and also such Clauses as relate to the constructing, printing, publishing, vending, and licensing of Nautical Almanacks, and other useful Tables; and for the more effectual Encouragement and Reward of such Person and Persons as shall discover a Method for finding the same, or shall make useful Discoveries in Navigation; and for the better making Experiments relating thereto. (Repealed by Statute Law Revision Act 1871 (34 & 35 Vict. c. 116))
Continuance of Laws Act 1774 (repealed)	14 Geo. 3. c. 67	2 June 1774
An Act to continue the several Laws therein mentioned for granting Liberty to carry Rice from His Majesty's Provinces of Carolina and Georgia, in America, directly to any Part of Europe Southward of Cape Finisterre; for granting the like Liberty to export Rice from South Carolina and Georgia, directly to any Part of America to the Southward of the said Provinces; for granting the like Liberty in the Exportation of Rice from East and West Florida, and from any Part of America Southward of South Carolina and Georgia. (Repealed by Statute Law Revision Act 1871 (34 & 35 Vict. c. 116))
Hops Act 1774 (repealed)	14 Geo. 3. c. 68	2 June 1774
An Act to prevent Frauds in the buying and selling of Hops. (Repealed by Hop Trade Act 1800 (39 & 40 Geo. 3. c. 81))
Loans or Exchequer Bills Act 1774 (repealed)	14 Geo. 3. c. 69	14 June 1774
An Act for raising a certain Sum of Money by Loans or Exchequer Bills, for the Service of the Year One thousand seven hundred and seventy-four. (Repealed by Statute Law Revision Act 1871 (34 & 35 Vict. c. 116))
Coin Act 1774 (repealed)	14 Geo. 3. c. 70	22 June 1774
An Act for applying a certain Sum of Money for calling in and recoining the deficient Gold Coin of this Realm; and for regulating the Manner of receiving the same at the Bank of England; and of taking there an Account of the Deficiency of the said Coin, and making Satisfaction for the same; and for authorizing all Persons to cut and deface all Gold Coin that shall not be allowed to be current by His Majesty's Proclamation. (Repealed by Coinage Act 1870 (33 & 34 Vict. c. 10))
Exportation (No. 5) Act 1774 (repealed)	14 Geo. 3. c. 71	14 June 1774
An Act to prevent the Exportation to Foreign Parts of Utensils made use of in the Cotton, Linen, Woollen, and Silk Manufactures of this Kingdom. (Repealed by Customs Law Repeal Act 1825 (6 Geo. 4. c. 105))
Duty on Cotton Stuffs, etc. Act 1774 (repealed)	14 Geo. 3. c. 72	14 June 1774
An Act, for ascertaining the Duty on printed, painted, stained, or dyed Stuffs, wholly made of Cotton, and manufactured in Great Britain; and for allowing the Use and Wear thereof, under certain Regulations. (Repealed by Statute Law Revision Act 1871 (34 & 35 Vict. c. 116))
Distillation, etc. Act 1774 (repealed)	14 Geo. 3. c. 73	14 June 1774
An Act to extend so much of an Act, passed in the Twelfth Year of the Reign of His present Majesty, (Note: Excise Act 1772 (12 Geo. 3. c. 46)) as relates to Distillers or Makers of Low Wines and Spirits from Corn, to every Kind of Distiller; and for the more effectual securing the Revenue of Excise arising from Low Wines and Spirits; and for ascertaining the Allowance to be made to the Manufacturers of Wool and Linen, in respect of the Duties on Soap imported and used in the Woollen and Linen Manufactures. (Repealed by Statute Law Revision Act 1861 (24 & 25 Vict. c. 101))
Importation (No. 2) Act 1774 (repealed)	14 Geo. 3. c. 74	14 June 1774
An Act for reducing the Rates and Duties payable upon the Importation of Great Raisins. (Repealed by Statute Law Revision Act 1861 (24 & 25 Vict. c. 101))
Southwark Workhouse Act 1774 (repealed)	14 Geo. 3. c. 75	20 May 1774
An Act for enlarging the present, or providing a new Workhouse for the Use of the Parish of Saint Saviour Southwark, and for regulating the Poor in such Workhouse; for widening King Street, at the Entrance into the High Street, Southwark; for making a Carriage Way from the said High Street, through the Greyhound Inn, into Queen Street, and for improving the Passage from thence into Gravel Lane, leading towards the Black Friars Bridge Road, in the Parish of Christ Church. (Repealed by Statute Law (Repeals) Act 2008 (c. 12))
National Debt Act 1774 (repealed)	14 Geo. 3. c. 76	22 June 1774
An act for redeeming the Sum of One Million of the Capital Stocks of Three Pounds per Centum Annuities, in the Manner and on the Terms therein mentioned; and for establishing a Lottery. (Repealed by Statute Law Revision Act 1870 (33 & 34 Vict. c. 69))
Insolvent Debtors, etc., Relief Act 1774 (repealed)	14 Geo. 3. c. 77	22 June 1774
An Act for the Relief of Insolvent Debtors; and for the Relief of Bankrupts in certain Cases. (Repealed by Statute Law Revision Act 1871 (34 & 35 Vict. c. 116))
Fires Prevention (Metropolis) Act 1774 or the Building Act 1774 or the London Building Act 1774 or the Great Building Act 1774 or the Great Codifying Act 1774 or the Black Act 1774	14 Geo. 3. c. 78	14 June 1774
An Act for the further and better Regulation of Buildings and Party Walls, and for the more effectually preventing Mischiefs by Fire, within the Cities of London and Westminster, and the Liberties thereof, and other the Parishes, Precincts, and Places, within the Weekly Bills of Mortality, the Parishes of Saint Mary-le-Bon, Paddington, Saint Pancras, and Saint Luke at Chelsea, in the County of Middlesex; and for indemnifying under certain Conditions, Builders and other Persons against the Penalties to which they are or may be liable for erecting Buildings within the Limits aforesaid contrary to Law.
Legal Rate of Interest Act 1774 (repealed)	14 Geo. 3. c. 79	14 June 1774
An Act for explaining an Act, made in the Twelfth Year of the Reign of Queen Anne, intituled, "An Act to reduce the Rate of Interest without any Prejudice to Parliamentary Securities." (Note: Usury Act 1713 (13 Ann. c. 15)) (Repealed by Statute Law Revision Act 1861 (24 & 25 Vict. c. 101))
Continuance of Laws (No. 2) Act 1774 (repealed)	14 Geo. 3. c. 80	14 June 1774
An Act to continue the several Laws therein mentioned for the better Encouragement of the making of Sail Cloth in Great Britain; and for securing the Duties upon foreign-made Sail Cloth, and charging foreign-made Sails with a Duty. (Repealed by Statute Law Revision Act 1871 (34 & 35 Vict. c. 116))
Parliamentary Elections (No. 3) Act 1774 (repealed)	14 Geo. 3. c. 81	14 June 1774
An Act for altering and amending an Act, made in the Sixteenth Year of His late Majesty’s Reign, intituled, "An Act to explain and amend the Laws touching the Election of Members to serve for the Commons in Parliament for that Part of Great Britain called Scotland; and to restrain the Partiality, and regulate the Conduct of Returning Officers at such Elections;" (Note: Parliamentary Elections Act 1742 (16 Geo. 2. c. 11)) by altering the Time of Notice, ordered by the said Act to be given, in the Service of Complaints to the Court of Session, of Wrongs done in Elections, and by regulating the Manner, and settling the Place, of Election of a Burgess to serve in Parliament for a District of Boroughs in Scotland, when the Election of the Magistrates and Council of a Borough, which ought in Course to be the presiding Borough at an Election, happens to be reduced, and made void, by a Decree of the Court of Session, and not revived by the Crown, when such Election is made. (Repealed by Statute Law Revision Act 1861 (24 & 25 Vict. c. 101))
Turnpike Roads (No. 3) Act 1774 (repealed)	14 Geo. 3. c. 82	14 June 1774
An Act for explaining and altering an Act, made in the Thirteenth Year of His present Majesty's Reign, intituled, "An Act to explain and amend, and reduce into One Act of Parliament, the general Laws now in being for regulating of Turnpike Roads in that Part of Great Britain called England, and for other Purposes;" so far as the same relates to the Payment of additional Tolls at Weighing Engines, and the Number of Horses to be used in Carriages drawn on Turnpike Roads; and for allowing certain Exemptions with respect to Weight and Payment of Toll in particular Cases. (Repealed by Turnpike Roads Act 1822 (3 Geo. 4. c. 126))
British North America (Quebec) Act 1774	14 Geo. 3. c. 83	22 June 1774
An Act for making more effectual Provision for the Government of the Province of Quebec in North America.
Naturalization Act 1774 (repealed)	14 Geo. 3. c. 84	14 June 1774
An Act to prevent certain Inconveniencies that may happen by Bills of Naturalization. (Repealed by Naturalization Act 1870 (33 & 34 Vict. c. 14))
Supply, etc. Act 1774 (repealed)	14 Geo. 3. c. 85	22 June 1774
An Act for granting to His Majesty a certain Sum of Money out of the Sinking Fund; and for applying certain Monies therein mentioned for the Service of the Year One thousand seven hundred and seventy-four; and for further appropriating the Supplies granted in this Session of Parliament, for carrying to the Aggregate Fund a Sum of Money which hath arisen by the Two Sevenths Excise; and for enabling the Barons of the Exchequer in Scotland to make out a Certificate for the Payment of the Sum of Five hundred Pounds to Lady Anne M'Kenzie, out of the Balance remaining of the Sum of Seventy-two thousand Pounds granted for paying the Creditors of the forfeited Estates in Scotland. (Repealed by Statute Law Revision Act 1871 (34 & 35 Vict. c. 116))
Continuance of Laws, etc. Act 1774 (repealed)	14 Geo. 3. c. 86	22 June 1774
An Act to continue several Laws therein mentioned, relating to the allowing a Drawback of the Duties upon the Exportation of Copper Bars imported; to the clandestine Running of uncustomed Goods, and preventing Frauds relating to the Customs; to the Encouragement of the Silk Manufactures, and for taking off several Duties on Merchandize exported, and reducing other Duties; to prevent the clandestine Running of Goods, and the Danger of Infection thereby; to the Premiums upon Masts, Yards, and Bowsprits, Tar, Pitch, and Turpentine; to the encouraging the Growth of Coffee in His Majesty’s Plantations in America; to the free Importation of Cochineal and Indict; to the prohibiting the Importation of Books reprinted abroad, and First composed, written, and printed in Great Britain; to the Bounty on the Exportation of British made Cordage; to the free Importation of certain Raw Hides and Skins from Ireland, and the British Plantations in America; to the regulating the Fees of Officers of the Customs and Naval Officers in America; to the preventing the spreading of the contagious Disorder among the Horned Cattle in Great Britain; and to extend the Provisions of an Act of the Twelfth Year of the Reign of King George the First, (Note: Customs, etc., Revenues Act 1725 (12 Geo. 1. c. 28)) for the Improvement of His Majesty's Revenues of Customs, Excise, and Inland Duties; so far as relates to the commencing Prosecutions for Penalties against the Revenue of Customs, to subsequent Acts. (Repealed by Statute Law Revision Act 1871 (34 & 35 Vict. c. 116))
Driving of Cattle (Metropolis) Act 1774 (repealed)	14 Geo. 3. c. 87	14 June 1774
An Act to prevent the Mischiefs that arise from driving Cattle within the Cities of London and Westminster, and Liberties thereof, and the Bills of Mortality. (Repealed by Statute Law Revision Act 1871 (34 & 35 Vict. c. 116))
Quebec Finance Act 1774 (repealed)	14 Geo. 3. c. 88	22 June 1774
An Act to establish a Fund towards further defraying the Charges of the Administration of Justice and Support of the Civil Government within the Province of Quebec in America. (Repealed by Statute Law (Repeals) Act 1973 (c. 39))
Sir Joseph Jekyll's Bequest Act 1774 (repealed)	14 Geo. 3. c. 89	14 June 1774
An Act to enable His Majesty to allow the Administrator, with the Will annexed, or other the Personal Representative of Sir Joseph Jekyll Knight, deceased, to sell Ten thousand Pounds South Sea Stock, Part of a Legacy given by him to the Use of the Sinking Fund, and to receive the Dividends due thereon, as also on Ten thousand Pounds East India Stock; and for applying the same as therein is mentioned. (Repealed by Statute Law Revision Act 1871 (34 & 35 Vict. c. 116))
Westminster (Watching) Act 1774 (repealed)	14 Geo. 3. c. 90	14 June 1774
An Act for the better Regulation of the Nightly Watch and Beadles within the City and Liberty of Westminster, and Parts adjacent; and for other Purposes therein mentioned. (Repealed by Tothill Fields Improvement Act 1825 (6 Geo. 4. c. cxxxiv))
Thames Navigation Act 1774 (repealed)	14 Geo. 3. c. 91	14 June 1774
An Act more effectually to improve and complete the Navigation of the River Thames Westward of London Bridge, within the Liberties of the City of London; and to prevent any Vessel or Barge from being moored in Taplow Mill Stream, in the County of Bucks. (Repealed by Thames Conservancy Act 1894 (57 & 58 Vict. c. clxxxvii))
Weights for Coin in the Mint Act 1774 (repealed)	14 Geo. 3. c. 92	22 June 1774
An Act for regulating and ascertaining the Weights to be made use of in weighing the Gold and Silver Coin in this Kingdom. (Repealed by Coinage Act 1870 (33 & 34 Vict. c. 10))
Lewisham Church Act 1774	14 Geo. 3. c. 93	14 June 1774
An Act for rebuilding the Church of the Parish of Lewisham, in the County of Kent.
Toxteth Park Church Act 1774	14 Geo. 3. c. 94	14 June 1774
An Act for establishing a new Church or Chapel erecting at Toxteth Park, in the Parish of Walton, near Liverpool, in the County Palatine of Lancaster.
Battersea Parish Church Act 1774	14 Geo. 3. c. 95	20 May 1774
An Act for rebuilding the Parish Churchy of Battersea, in the County of Surrey, and for enlarging the Church Yard of the said Parish Church.
Aire and Calder Navigation Act 1774	14 Geo. 3. c. 96	14 June 1774
An Act to amend an Act, passed in the Tenth and Eleventh Years of the Reign of King William the Third, intituled, "An Act for the making and keeping navigable the Rivers of Aire and Calder, in the County of York;" (Note: Aire and Calder Navigation Act 1698 (10 Will. 3. c. 25)) and for improving the Navigation of the said River Aire, from Weeland to the River Ouze; and for making a navigable Canal from the said River Aire, at or near Haddlesey, to the River Ouze, at the Old Brick Garth at Ouze Gate End, within the Township of Selby, in the said County; and for other Purposes.
Tunbridge Wells to Uckfield Road Act 1774 (repealed)	14 Geo. 3. c. 97	9 March 1774
An Act to continue, amend, and render more effectual, an Act, made in the Sixth Year of the Reign of His present Majesty, (Note: Tunbridge Wells to Uckfield Road Act 1766 (6 Geo. 3. c. 85)) for repairing the Road from the Turnpike at Tunbridge Wells, in the County of Kent, to Ringles Cross, near Uckfield, in the County of Sussex. (Repealed by Tunbridge Wells and Uckfield Road Act 1829 (10 Geo. 4. c. lv))
Wetherby to Grassington Road Act 1774 (repealed)	14 Geo. 3. c. 98	9 March 1774
An Act to enlarge the Term and Powers of an Act, made in the Thirty-second Year of His late Majesty, (Note: Wetherby to Grassington Road Act 1758 (32 Geo. 2. c. 71)) for repairing and widening the High Road from Wetherby to Grassington, in the County of York. (Repealed by Ripon and Pateley Bridge Road Act 1821 (1 & 2 Geo. 4. c. xi), Road from Knaresborough to Ripon and Pateley Bridge Act 1826 (7 Geo. 4. c. xiv) and Annual Turnpike Acts Continuance Act 1871 (34 & 35 Vict. c. 115))
Lancashire Roads Act 1774 (repealed)	14 Geo. 3. c. 99	31 March 1774
An Act for enlarging the Term and Powers of an Act, made in the Twenty-eighth Year of His late Majesty, (Note: Lancashire Roads Act 1755 (28 Geo. 2. c. 58)) for repairing and widening the Roads from the Town of Manchester to the Town of Rochdale, and from a Place called The White Smithy, (Note: The White Smithy was located at the junction of the A665 Bury Old Road and the A576 Middleton Road in Crumpsall. 53°30′57″N 2°14′58″W) in the Township of Crumpsal, to the Town of Bury, and from a Place called Besses of the Barn to Ratcliffe Bridge, in the County Palatine of Lancaster; and for empowering the Trustees under the said Act to repair a Lane called Sheepfoot Lane, in the said County. (Repealed by Lancashire Roads Act 1798 (38 Geo. 3. c. xi))
Cheshire Roads Act 1774 (repealed)	14 Geo. 3. c. 100	31 March 1774
An Act for enlarging the Term and Powers of an Act, passed in the Twenty-sixth Year of the Reign of His late Majesty King George the Second, (Note: Cheshire Roads Act 1753 (26 Geo. 2. c. 62)) for repairing and widening the Roads from Henshalls Smithy, upon Cranage Green, through the Town of Nether Knutsford, and by the South Guide Post in Mere, and Bucklow Hill, to the Town of Altnncham, in the County Palatine of Chester; and from the said Guide Post to Warrington, in the County of Lancaster; and from Bucklow Hill a fore said, to Penny’s Lane, near Northwich, in the said County of Chester. (Repealed by Road from Cranage Green to Altrincham Act 1820 (1 Geo. 4. c. xxv))
Notts Roads Act 1774 (repealed)	14 Geo. 3. c. 101	31 March 1774
An Act for repairing and widening several Roads near the Towns of Hockerton, Kirklington, Southwell, Normanton, and Winkbourne, in the County of Nottingham. (Repealed by Roads near Hockerton (Nottinghamshire) Act 1818 (58 Geo. 3. c. vii) and Annual Turnpike Acts Continuance Act 1873 (36 & 37 Vict. c. 90))
Glasgow Roads Act 1774 (repealed)	14 Geo. 3. c. 102	5 May 1774
An Act to enlarge the Terms and Powers of Two Acts, made in the Twenty-sixth (Note: Glasgow Roads Act 1753 (26 Geo. 2. c. 90)) and Twenty-seventh (Note: Glasgow Roads Act 1754 (27 Geo. 2. c. 27)) Years of the Reign of His late Majesty King George the Second, for repairing several Roads leading into the City of Glasgow, so far as the same relate to the Road leading from the said City of Glasgow, through Cowcaddens, to that Part of the Water of Kelvire called The Milnford of Garscube. (Repealed by Road from Glasgow to Garscube Act 1809 (49 Geo. 3. c. xxx))
Clyde Navigation Act 1774 (repealed)	14 Geo. 3. c. 103	5 May 1774
An Act for explaining and amending an Act, made in the Thirty-second Year of His late Majesty, (Note: Clyde Bridge Act 1758 (32 Geo. 2. c. 62)) for improving the Navigation of the River Clyde, to the City of Glasgow; and for building a Bridge cross the said River, from the said City to the Village of Gorbells; and Part of another Act, made in the Eighth Year of His present Majesty, (Note: Glasgow (Improvement) Act 1768 (8 Geo. 3. c. 16)) for explaining and amending the said Act; and for repairing, widening, and enlarging, the old Bridge across the River of Clyde, from the City of Glasgow to the Village of Gorbells. (Repealed by Glasgow Bridges Act 1845 (8 & 9 Vict. c. cxxxiii))
Hants and Wilts Roads Act 1774 (repealed)	14 Geo. 3. c. 104	5 May 1774
An Act to enlarge the Term and Powers of an Act, made in the Twenty-eighth Year of the Reign of King George the Second, (Note: Wiltshire Roads Act 1755 (28 Geo. 2. c. 44)) for repairing and widening the Road from Basingstoke, through Wortin, Overton, Whitchurch, Husband Priors, Andover, and Middle Wallop, in the County of Southampton, to a Place called Lobcomb Corner, in the Parish of Winterslow, in the County of Wilts; for including the Road from Spittle House, over Weyhill, to Mullens Pond, as directed by an Act, made in the Twenty-ninth Year of His said Majesty; (Note: Stockbridge Roads Act 1756 (29 Geo. 2. c. 46)) and for amending the Roads from Andover, through Charlton, towards Tangley, and from Charlton to Clanfield Bottom, and from Weyhill to Sarson Street; and also the Road through the said Town, of Basingstoke. (Repealed by Basingstoke and Lobcombe Corner Road Act 1821 (1 & 2 Geo. 4. c. xxv))
Glasgow Roads (No. 2) Act 1774 (repealed)	14 Geo. 3. c. 105	5 May 1774
An Act to continue the Terms of Two Acts, made in the Twenty-sixth and Twenty-seventh Years of the Reign of His late Majesty King George the Second, for repairing several Roads leading into the City of Glasgow, so far as the same relate to the Roads from the City of Glasgow to Yocker Bridge, to Renfrew Bridge, to the Three Mile House, to the Town of Airdrie, and from the Village of Gorbells to The Chapel of Cambuslang, in the Counties of Lanerk and Renfrew. (Repealed by Road from Glasgow to Yoker Bridge Act 1824 (5 Geo. 4. c. cxi) and Glasgow and Lanark Road Act 1843 (6 & 7 Vict. c. xxxix))
Hedon Haven Act 1774	14 Geo. 3. c. 106	20 May 1774
An Act for recovering, improving, and maintaining, the Navigation of the Haven of Hedon, in Holdernesse, in the East Riding of the County of York.
Holderness (Drainage) Act 1774 (repealed)	14 Geo. 3. c. 107	20 May 1774
An Act for draining and preserving the Low Grounds and Carrs, within the Parishes, Townships, and Places, of Winestead, Pattrington, South Frodingham, Hollym, Rimswell, Owthorne otherwise Seathorne, Withernsea, England Hill, and Walker Fields, in Holderness, in the East Riding of the County of York. (Repealed by Winestead Level Drainage Act 1867 (30 & 31 Vict. c. lxx))
Bloomsbury (Poor Relief) Act 1774 (repealed)	14 Geo. 3. c. 108 (Note: This appears to be a duplicate entry for 14 Geo. 3. c. 62)	20 May 1774
An Act for better governing and employing the Poor, and making and collecting the Poor's Rates, within the Parishes of Saint Giles in the Fields and Saint George Bloomsbury, in the County of Middlesex. (Repealed by Parishes of St. Giles in the Fields and St. George Bloomsbury Act 1830 (11 Geo. 4. & 1 Will. 4. c. x))
Ayr Roads Act 1774 (repealed)	14 Geo. 3. c. 109	20 May 1774
An Act to enlarge the Term of an Act, made in the Seventh Year of the Reign of His present Majesty, (Note: Ayr Roads Act 1767 (7 Geo. 3. c. 106)) for repairing and widening several Roads leading from the Town of Ayr, and other Roads therein mentioned, in the County of Ayr; and for repairing and widening certain other Roads within the said County of Ayr. (Repealed by Ayr (County) Turnpike Roads Act 1805 (45 Geo. 3. c. xxviii))
Hinckley to Melbourne Common Road Act 1774 (repealed)	14 Geo. 3. c. 110	20 May 1774
An Act to enlarge the Term and Powers of an Act, passed in the Thirty-third Year of the Reign of His late Majesty King George the Second, (Note: Leicester and Derby Roads Act 1759 (33 Geo. 2. c. 46)) for repairing and widening the High Roads from Hinckley to Woeful Bridge; and also from Hoo-ash Lane, through Old Lane, and from Swannington to Lee Gutter, and from thence to Melbourne Common; and from Ibstock to Measham, in the Counties of Leicester and Derby; and for repairing and widening the Road from Phiney's House, in the Liberty of Osbaston, to Chesire's House, in the Liberty of Carlton; and also the Road from the Turnpike Road at Swannington, along Burton’s Lane, to the Coal Fields; and also the Road from the Toll-Gate in Old Lane to the Leicester and Ashby-de-la-zouch Turnpike Roads. (Repealed by Road from Hinckley to Melbourne Common (Derbyshire) Act 1828 (9 Geo. 4. c. v))
Gloucestershire Roads Act 1774 (repealed)	14 Geo. 3. c. 111	20 May 1774
An Act to enlarge the Term and Powers of so much of an Act of Parliament, made and passed in the Twenty-ninth Year of the Reign of His late Majesty King George the Second, (Note: Gloucestershire Roads Act 1756 (29 Geo. 2. c. 51)) for repairing and widening several Roads therein mentioned, from the Town of Tewkesbury, in the County of Gloucester, as relates to the Second District of Roads therein mentioned; and to amend the Road from Elstone Church to the Turnpike Road from Cirencester to Gloucester, near a Place called Comb End Beeches, in the said County of Gloucester. (Repealed by Statute Law (Repeals) Act 2013 (c. 2))
Bewdley Roads Act 1774 (repealed)	14 Geo. 3. c. 112	20 May 1774
An Act for continuing, altering, and amending, an Act, made and passed in the Twenty-sixth Year of His late Majesty King George the Second, intituled, "An Act for repairing and widening several Roads leading from the Town of Bewdley, in the County of Worcester, to the several Places therein mentioned, in the Counties of Worcester and Salop respectively." (Note: Bewdley Roads Act 1753 (26 Geo. 2. c. 39)) (Repealed by Bewdley Roads Act 1821 (1 & 2 Geo. 4. c. lxxxix) (Note: Incorrectly cited as "1 & 2 Geo. 4. c. lxxix" in the Chronological Table of the Statutes.) and Annual Turnpike Acts Continuance Act 1875 (38 & 39 Vict. c. cxciv))
Leicester to Peterborough Road Act 1774 (repealed)	14 Geo. 3. c. 113	2 June 1774
An Act for enlarging the Term and Powers of an Act, made in the Twenty-seventh Year of King George the Second, (Note: Leicester to Peterborough Road Act 1754 (27 Geo. 2. c. 30)) for repairing and widening the Road from the Borough of Leicester, to and by the North Side of the Town of Uppingham, in the County of Rutland, and to Wansford, in the County of Northampton, and from thence to Peterborough, in the said County of Northampton; and for repairing the Road from the Termination of the said Road at Peterborough to the Market Place there. (Repealed by Road from Leicester to Peterborough Act 1801 (41 Geo. 3. (U.K.) c. cxviii))
Rotherham to Tankersley Park Road Act 1774 (repealed)	14 Geo. 3. c. 114	2 June 1774
An Act for enlarging the Term and Powers of so much of an Act, made in the Fourth Year of the Reign of His present Majesty, (Note: Derby and Yorkshire Roads Act 1764 (4 Geo. 3. c. 65)) as relates to the Road from the Town of Rotheram, in the County of York, to the Turnpike Road at the East End of Tankersley Park, in the said County. (Repealed by Rotherham and Tankersley Park Turnpike Road Act 1825 (6 Geo. 4. c. lii))
North Shields to Newcastle Road Act 1774 (repealed)	14 Geo. 3. c. 115	2 June 1774
An Act to enlarge the Term and Powers of an Act, made in the Twenty-second Year of His late Majesty King George the Second, (Note: North Shields to Newcastle Road Act 1748 (22 Geo. 2. c. 9)) for repairing the Road from North Shields, in the County of Northumberland, to the Town of Newcastle upon Tyne. (Repealed by Road from North Shields to Newcastle-upon-Tyne Act 1831 (1 & 2 Will. 4. c. lxxii))
Shoreditch (Streets) Act 1774 (repealed)	14 Geo. 3. c. 116	2 June 1774
An Act for empowering the Trustees for repairing the Road from the Stone's End in Saint Leonard Shoreditch, to the furthermost Part of the Northern Road in the Parish of Enfield, in the County of Middlesex, to cause Part of the said Road to be lighted, watched, and watered; and for lighting, watching, and watering, the Parish of Saint Mary Stoke Newington, in the said County. (Repealed by London Government (Borough of Shoreditch) Order in Council 1901 (SR&O 1901/221) and SR&O 1901/227)
Beverley to Hessle Ferry Turnpike Act 1774 (repealed)	14 Geo. 3. c. 117	14 June 1774
An Act to enlarge the Term and Powers of an Act, passed in the Ninth Year of His present Majesty, (Note: Beverley to Hessle Ferry Turnpike Act 1769 (9 Geo. 3. c. 79)) for repairing and widening, the Road (Note: Beverley Road/Hull Road.) from Beverley (Note: Beverley, East Riding of Yorkshire.) to the Ferry at Hessle, (Note: There was a ferry across the Humber Estuary from Hessle to Barton Waterside, Barton-upon-Humber. 53°43′01″N 0°26′04″W) and from the Malton Guide Post (Note: The Malton Guide Post was at Norwoods on the Beverley Road. 53°47′50″N 0°27′05″W) to the Gravel Pit at Cottingham, (Note: Cottingham, East Riding of Yorkshire.) in the County of York; and for repairing and widening other Roads therein mentioned. (Repealed by Beverley, Hessle and North Cave Turnpike Roads (Yorkshire) Act 1832 (2 & 3 Will. 4. c. cix))
Hunts Roads Act 1774 (repealed)	14 Geo. 3. c. 118	2 June 1774
An Act for continuing the Term, and enlarging the Powers granted by an Act, passed in the Twenty-eighth Year of His late Majesty's Reign, (Note: Kimbolton Road Act 1755 (28 Geo. 2. c. 33)) for repairing the Road from the North End of Brown's Lane, in Great Stoughton, in the County of Huntingdon, through Kimbolton and Higham Ferrers, to the Way Post near Wellingborough Bridge, in the County of Northampton, and from the Pound in Kimbolton to the Way Post in Great Catworth Field, near Brington Bridge, in the said County of Huntingdon; and for repealing so much of an Act of the Tenth Year of His present Majesty's Reign, (Note: Bedford and Hunts Roads Act 1770 (10 Geo. 3. c. 83)) as relates to the Road between the North End of Brown's Lane and the South End thereof. (Repealed by Great Staughton and Wellingborough and Kimbolton and Brinton Bridge Roads Act 1819 (59 Geo. 3. c. xcix) and Annual Turnpike Acts Continuance Act 1876 (39 & 40 Vict. c. 39))

=== Private acts ===
Short title	Citation	Royal assent
Long title
Swinton Inclosure Act 1774	14 Geo. 3. c. 1 Pr.	9 March 1774
An Act for dividing and enclosing the Open Fields, Common Pastures, and other unenclosed Grounds, within the Manor and Township of Swinton, in the Parish of Appleton in the Street, in the North Riding of the County of York.
Duddington Inclosure Act 1774	14 Geo. 3. c. 2 Pr.	9 March 1774
An Act for dividing and enclosing the Open and Commonable Fields, within the Parish of Duddington, in the County of Northampton.
Ibstock Inclosure Act 1774	14 Geo. 3. c. 3 Pr.	9 March 1774
An Act for dividing and enclosing the Common and Open Fields, Wastes and Common Grounds, within the Township and Liberty of Ibstock, in the County of Leicester.
Severn Stoke Inclosure Act 1774	14 Geo. 3. c. 4 Pr.	9 March 1774
An Act for dividing and enclosing the Common Meadows, Commons, and Waste Lands, within the Manor and Parish of Severn Stoke, in the County of Worcester.
Abbot's Ann Inclosure Act 1774	14 Geo. 3. c. 5 Pr.	9 March 1774
An Act for dividing and enclosing the Open and Common Fields and Downs, within the Parish of Abbots Ann, in the County of Southampton.
Owmby Inclosure Act 1774	14 Geo. 3. c. 6 Pr.	9 March 1774
An Act for dividing and enclosing several Common Fields, Grounds, and Pastures, within the Parish of Owmby, in the County of Lincoln.
Butterton Inclosure Act 1774	14 Geo. 3. c. 7 Pr.	9 March 1774
An Act for dividing and enclosing the Open Field Land or Stinted Pasture, Common and Waste Grounds, within the Manor of Butterton, in the Parish of Mayfield, in the County of Stafford.
Staunton Inclosure Act 1774	14 Geo. 3. c. 8 Pr.	9 March 1774
An Act for dividing and enclosing the Open and Common Fields, Lot Grounds, and Commonable Lands, within the Parish of Staunton, in the County of Gloucester.
West Retford Inclosure Act 1774	14 Geo. 3. c. 9 Pr.	9 March 1774
An Act for dividing and enclosing certain Open Arable Fields, Meadows, and Stinted Common Pastures, in the Parish of West Retford, in the County of Nottingham.
Jones's Name Act 1774	14 Geo. 3. c. 10 Pr.	9 March 1774
An Act to enable Thomas Purnell Jones Esquire, and his Issue, to take and use the Surname and Arms of Purnell.
Naturalization of Samuel Rapillard and Abraham Delapierre.	14 Geo. 3. c. 11 Pr.	9 March 1774
An Act for naturalizing Samuel Rapillard and Abraham Delapierre.
De Saumaize's Naturalization Act 1774	14 Geo. 3. c. 12 Pr.	9 March 1774
An Act for naturalizing Louis de Saumaise.
Van Yzendoorn's Naturalization Act 1774	14 Geo. 3. c. 13 Pr.	9 March 1774
An Act for naturalizing Peter Van Yzendoorn.
Gleichman's Naturalization Act 1774	14 Geo. 3. c. 14 Pr.	9 March 1774
An Act for naturalizing Theodore George Gleichman.
Degen's Naturalization Act 1774	14 Geo. 3. c. 15 Pr.	9 March 1774
An Act for naturalizing George Christopher Degen.
Pryce's Estate Act 1774	14 Geo. 3. c. 16 Pr.	31 March 1774
An Act to enable Trustees, with the Consent of the Persons claiming under the Will of Mary Pryce Spinster, deceased, to cut down and fell the Timber upon the Settled Estates of the said Mary Pryce, in the County of Merioneth; and to invest the Monies arising therefrom in the Purchase of Lands and Hereditaments, to be settled to the uses of the said Will and for other Purposes.
Benson's Estate Act 1774	14 Geo. 3. c. 17 Pr.	31 March 1774
An Act for vesting certain Estates in the County of Devon, late of Thomas Benson Esquire, deceased, in Trustees, to be sold to raise Money to be applied under the Direction of the Court of Exchequer, in Payment of certain Legacies affecting the same Estates.
Watts' Estate Act 1774	14 Geo. 3. c. 18 Pr.	31 March 1774
An Act for vesting the Estate, late of William Watts Esquire, called South Hill or Fisher’s Lodge, in the County of Berks, in Trustees to fell the same, and to lay out the Money arising by such Sale in the Purchase of another Estate, to be settled to the Uses of his Will.
Tottington Inclosure Act 1774	14 Geo. 3. c. 19 Pr.	31 March 1774
An Act for dividing and enclosing the Common Fields, Half-Year Lands, Common Pastures, Common Meadows, Lammas Meadows, Commons, Commonable Lands, Heaths, and Waste Grounds, within the Parish of Tottington, in the County of Norfolk.
Beetley, Great Bittering, and Gressenhall (Norfolk) Inclosures Act 1774	14 Geo. 3. c. 20 Pr.	31 March 1774
An Act for dividing, allotting, and enclosing, the Open and Common Fields, Crofts, Brecks, and other Half-Year Closes, in the Parishes of Beetley, Great Bittering, and Gressenhall, in the County of, Norfolk, within the Liberty of Sheepwalk, called Beetley Sheepwalk; and for dividing, allotting, and enclosing, certain Commons and Waste Lands within the said Parish of Beetley.
Enabling John Earl Spencer to make inclosures in Dunton (Buckinghamshire) and for vesting in him certain glebe lands and tithes belonging to parish rectory and for compensating the rector in lieu thereof.	14 Geo. 3. c. 21 Pr.	31 March 1774
An Act for enabling the Right Honourable John Earl Spencer to enclose the several Open and Common Fields, in the Parish of Dunton, in the County of Bucks; and for vesting certain Glebe Lands, and the Tithes belonging to the Rectory of Dunton aforesaid, in the said John Earl Spencer; and for making a Compensation to the Rector of the said Parish in lieu thereof.
Ratcliffe upon Wreak Inclosure Act 1774	14 Geo. 3. c. 22 Pr.	31 March 1774
An Act for dividing and enclosing the Open Fields, Meadow, Failure, and all other Commonable Grounds, within the Manor of Ratcliffe upon Wreak, in the County of Leicester.
Cropredy Inclosure Act 1774	14 Geo. 3. c. 23 Pr.	31 March 1774
An Act for dividing and enclosing certain Open Common Fields, Pastures, and Waste Grounds, called Cropredy Field and Act Mead, within the Parish of Cropredy, in the County of Oxford.
Waddesdon Inclosure Act 1774	14 Geo. 3. c. 24 Pr.	31 March 1774
An Act for dividing and enclosing certain Open and Common Fields, Common Meadows, Common Grounds, and Commonable Places, in the Parish of Waddesdon, in the County of Bucks.
Hucklescote and Donnington-on-the-Heath (Leicestershire) Inclosure Act 1774	14 Geo. 3. c. 25 Pr.	31 March 1774
An Act for dividing, allotting, and enclosing, the Open Fields, Wastes, and Commonable Places, of Hucklescote and Donnington on the Heath, in the Parish of Ibstock, in the County of Leicester.
Oswaldtwistle Inclosure Act 1774	14 Geo. 3. c. 26 Pr.	31 March 1774
An Act for dividing and enclosing the Commons and Waste Grounds, within the Manor or Lordship of Oswaldtwistle, in the Parish of Whalley, in the County Palatine of Lancaster.
Sutton St. Ann's or Sutton Bonnington or St. Ann's End (Nottinghamshire) Inclosure Act 1774	14 Geo. 3. c. 27 Pr.	31 March 1774
An Act for dividing and enclosing all the Open Fields, Meadows, Pastures, and Commonable Grounds, within the Township or Liberty of Sutton Saint Ann's, otherwise Sutton Bonnington, commonly called Saint Ann's End, in the County of Nottingham.
Bishop's Itchington Inclosure Act 1774	14 Geo. 3. c. 28 Pr.	31 March 1774
An Act for dividing and enclosing several Pieces and Parcels of Land, called Bishop's Itchington Heath, Christmas Hill, Palmer's Furze, The Olt, and Commonable Places, within the Parish of Bishop’s Itchington, in the County of Warwick.
West Keal Inclosure Act 1774	14 Geo. 3. c. 29 Pr.	31 March 1774
An Act for dividing and enclosing certain Open Common Fields, Meadows, Ings, and other Commonable Lands and Walle Grounds, within the Parish of West Keal, in the County of Lincoln.
Southwell and Westhorpe Inclosure Act 1774	14 Geo. 3. c. 30 Pr.	31 March 1774
An Act for dividing and enclosing the Common Pasture or Waste Ground, called Cottmore, and such Part of the Common Pasture or Waste Ground, called Radley, as lies within the Districts of Southwell and Westhorp'e, in the Parish of Southwell, in the County of Nottingham.
Stratford-upon-Avon Inclosure Act 1774	14 Geo. 3. c. 31 Pr.	31 March 1774
An Act for dividing and enclosing certain Common Fields, Common Meadows, Pastures, and other Commonable Lands, within the Parish of Old Stratford, otherwise Stratford upon Avon, in the County of Warwick.
Greasley Inclosure Act 1774	14 Geo. 3. c. 32 Pr.	31 March 1774
An Act for dividing and enclosing certain Commons and Waste Grounds, called Newthorpe Great Common and Begerley Common, in the Parish of Greasley, in the County of Nottingham.
Staverton Inclosure Act 1774	14 Geo. 3. c. 33 Pr.	31 March 1774
An Act for dividing and enclosing the Open and Common Fields, Common Pastures, Common Meadows, and other Commonable Lands, of and within the Parish and Liberties of Staverton, in the County of Northampton.
Halford Inclosure Act 1774	14 Geo. 3. c. 34 Pr.	31 March 1774
An Act for dividing and enclosing the Open and Common Fields, and other Commonable Lands, in the Parish of Halford, and County of Warwick.
Wilsford Inclosure Act 1774	14 Geo. 3. c. 35 Pr.	31 March 1774
An Act for dividing and enclosing the Common and Open Fields, Meadows, Pastures, Heath, and Waste Grounds, within the Manor and Parish of Willsford, otherwise Willesford, in the County of Lincoln.
Heatley's Divorce Act 1774	14 Geo. 3. c. 36 Pr.	31 March 1774
An Act to dissolve the Marriage of Richard Heatley with Arrabella Dawon his now Wife, and to enable him to marry again; and for other Purposes therein mentioned.
Asheton's Name Act 1774	14 Geo. 3. c. 37 Pr.	31 March 1774
An Act to enable Thomas Asshcton Esquire, and his Sons, and the Heirs Male of their Bodies, to take and use the Surname of Smith, pursuant to the Will of William Smith Esquire, deceased.
Keck's Name Act 1774	14 Geo. 3. c. 38 Pr.	31 March 1774
An Act to enable the Honourable Henrietta Charlotte Keck Spinster, and her Issue, to take, use, and bear, the Surname and Arms of Tracy, pursuant to the Will of Robert Tracy Esquire, deceased.
Naturalization of Nicholas Haeseler and John Erich.	14 Geo. 3. c. 39 Pr.	31 March 1774
An Act for naturalizing Nicholas Joachim Haeseler and John Erich.
Baumgartner's Naturalization Act 1774	14 Geo. 3. c. 40 Pr.	31 March 1774
An Act for naturalizing Jacob Julien Baumgartner.
Confirmation of an agreement between William Earl of Radnor and Queen's College, Cambridge for an exchange of Seagrave (Leicestershire) advowson for Great Chiverell (Wiltshire) advowson.	14 Geo. 3. c. 41 Pr.	5 May 1774
An Act for confirming an Agreement between William Earl of Radnor and the President and Fellows of Queen’s College, Cambridge, for an Exchange of the Advowson of Scagrave, in ‘the County of Leicester, for the Advowson of Great Chiverel, in the County of Wilts.
Earl of Breadalbane's Estate Act 1774	14 Geo. 3. c. 42 Pr.	5 May 1774
An Act for vesting in John Earl of Breadalbane, and his Heirs, in Fee-Simple, certain Lands, Part of his Entailed Estate, in the County of Argyll; and for settling, in lieu thereof, other Lands lying contiguous to, and interspersed with, the said Entailed Estate.
Canterbury Cathedral Estate Act 1774	14 Geo. 3. c. 43 Pr.	5 May 1774
An Act for enabling the Dean and Chapter of Canterbury, Henry Penton Esquire, and Thomas Brandon, to grant Building Leases, pursuant to Two several Agreements entered into for that Purpose.
Charging the rectory, parsonage and accompanying lands of Sonning (Berkshire and Oxfordshire) with three perpetual yearly rent charges or annual payments to Doctor Thomas Greene and his successors, the deans of Sarum, and divesting the fee simple and inheritance of said premises to Robert Palmer and heirs.	14 Geo. 3. c. 44 Pr.	5 May 1774
An Act to subject and charge the Rectory and Parsonage Impropriate of Suning, otherwise Sonynge, in the Counties of Berks and Oxon, and the Manor, Lands, Tithes, and Hereditaments, thereunto belonging, with the Payment of Three several perpetual yearly Rent Charges, or annual Payments, to Doctor Thomas Greene and his Successors, Deans of Sarum; and for divesting the Fee-Simple and Inheritance of the said Premises out of him and his Successors; and for vesting the same, so charged, in Robert Palmer Esquire, his Heirs and Assigns.
Mitford's Estate Act 1774	14 Geo. 3. c. 45 Pr.	5 May 1774
An Act for vesting Part of the Freehold and Leasehold Estates, devised by the Will of John Mitford Esquire, deceased, in Trustees, to sell the same, for discharging Incumbrances, and for laying out the Residue of the Money arising by such Sale in the Purchase of other Lands and Hereditaments, to be settled in lieu thereof, to the like Uses.
Foster's Estate Act 1774	14 Geo. 3. c. 46 Pr.	5 May 1774
An Act for vesting Part of the Settled Estates of William Foster and Levina Davey Foster his Wife, in Holdingham and New Sleaford, in the County of Lincoln, in the said William Foster, in Fee-Simple; and for settling other Estates of the said William Foster in Alderchurch, otherwise Algarkirke, in the said County, of greater Value, in Lieu thereof.
Upton Snodsbury Inclosure Act 1774	14 Geo. 3. c. 47 Pr.	5 May 1774
An Act for dividing, allotting, and enclosing the Common Fields, Common Meadows, and Waste and Commonable Lands, within the Parish of Upton Snodsbury, in the County of Worcester.
Spridlington Inclosure Act 1774	14 Geo. 3. c. 48 Pr.	5 May 1774
An Act for dividing and enclosing several Open Fields, Meadows, Pastures, and Commons, within the Parish of Spridlington, in the County of Lincoln.
Heapham Inclosure Act 1774	14 Geo. 3. c. 49 Pr.	5 May 1774
An Act for dividing and enclosing certain Open Fields and Meadows, Stinted Common Pastures, and Free Commons, in the Parish of Heapham, in the County of Lincoln.
Ludborough Inclosure Act 1774	14 Geo. 3. c. 50 Pr.	5 May 1774
An Act for dividing and enclosing the Open Fields, Meadows, Common Pastures, and Waste Grounds, in the Manor and Parish of Ludborough, in the County of Lincoln.
Potterhanworth Inclosure Act 1774	14 Geo. 3. c. 51 Pr.	5 May 1774
An Act for dividing and enclosing the Open and Common Fields, Meadows, Pastures, Fens, Heath, and Waste Lands, within the Parish of Potterhanworth, in the County of Lincoln.
Kidderminster Inclosure Act 1774	14 Geo. 3. c. 52 Pr.	5 May 1774
An Act for dividing and enclosing several Fields, Commons, and Waste Lands, in the Manor of the Foreign of Kidderminster, in the Parish of Kidderminster, in the County of Worcester.
Twyford and Charndon Inclosure Act 1774	14 Geo. 3. c. 53 Pr.	5 May 1774
An Act for dividing and enclosing the Open Common Fields, Meadows, Pastures, and other Common Lands, within the Hamlets of Twyford and Charndon, in the Parish of Twyford, in the County of Buckingham.
Forest of Knaresborough Inclosure (Amendment) Act 1774	14 Geo. 3. c. 54 Pr.	5 May 1774
An Act to amend an Act, passed in the Tenth Year of the Reign of His present Majesty, intituled, "An Act for dividing and enclosing such of the Open Parts of the District called The Forest of Knaresborough, in the County of York, as lie within the Eleven Constableries thereof; and for other Purposes therein mentioned." (Note: Forest of Knaresborough Inclosure Act 1770 (10 Geo. 3. c. 94 Pr.))
Wroot Inclosure Act 1774	14 Geo. 3. c. 55 Pr.	5 May 1774
An Act for dividing and enclosing the Open Arable Fields, Meadows, Pastures, Commons, and Waste Grounds, in the Parish of Wroot, in the County of Lincoln.
Foleshill Inclosure Act 1774	14 Geo. 3. c. 56 Pr.	5 May 1774
An Act for dividing and enclosing the Common Fields, Waste Grounds, and Commonable Lands, within the Parish of Foleshill, in the County of the City of Coventry.
Warmington Inclosure Act 1774	14 Geo. 3. c. 57 Pr.	5 May 1774
An Act for dividing and enclosing the Common and Open Fields, Meadows, and Commonable Lands, in the Parish of Warmington, in the County of Northampton.
Weeting Inclosure Act 1774	14 Geo. 3. c. 58 Pr.	5 May 1774
An Act for dividing, allotting, and enclosing, the Common Fields, half-year Enclosures, Lammas Meadows, Brecks, Heaths, Warrens, Commons, and Waste Lands, within the Parish of Weeting, in the County of Norfolk.
Barton Bendish Inclosure Act 1774	14 Geo. 3. c. 59 Pr.	5 May 1774
An Act for dividing, allotting, and enclosing, the Old whole-year Lands, Common Fields, half-year Enclosures, Lammas Meadows, Heaths, Commons, and Waste Lands, within the Parish of Barton, otherwise Barton Bendish, or Eastmore, in the county of Norfolk.
Eggers' Naturalization Act 1774	14 Geo. 3. c. 60 Pr.	5 May 1774
An Act for naturalizing Gustav Nicolaus Eggers.
Everth's Naturalization Act 1774	14 Geo. 3. c. 61 Pr.	5 May 1774
An Act for naturalizing John Everth.
De Bezancenet's Naturalization Act 1774	14 Geo. 3. c. 62 Pr.	5 May 1774
An Act for naturalizing Captain David Francis De Bezancenet.
Esberger's Naturalization Act 1774	14 Geo. 3. c. 63 Pr.	5 May 1774
An Act for naturalizing Christian Frederick Esberger.
Creuzé's Estate Act 1774	14 Geo. 3. c. 64 Pr.	20 May 1774
An Act for vesting the Settled Estates of Francis Creuzé and Sarah his Wife, in the County of Worcester, in Trustees, to be sold; and for laying out the Money arising by such Sale in the Purchase of other Lands, to be settled to the same Uses.
Wilson's Estate Act 1774	14 Geo. 3. c. 65 Pr.	20 May 1774
An Act for Sale of the Freehold and Copyhold Estates, late of John Wilson Esquire, deceased, situate in the County of Surrey, and for laying out the Money to arise by such Sale for the Benefit of John Wilson, an Infant, his eldest Son and Heir at Law.
Palmes' Estate Act 1774	14 Geo. 3. c. 66 Pr.	20 May 1774
An Act for vesting Part of the Estates, late of George Palmes Esquire, deceased, in the Lordship or Township of Nabourn, otherwise Noburn, in the East Riding of the County of York, in Trustees, to be sold; and to apply the Monies thereby arising in Payment of the Debts of the said George Palmes, deceased; and for other Purposes therein mentioned.
St. Nicholas Parish Vicarage (Newcastle-upon-Tyne): enabling vicar to lease part to William Lowes.	14 Geo. 3. c. 67 Pr.	20 May 1774
An Act to enable the Vicar of the Parish Church of Saint Nicholas, in the Town and County of the Town of Newcastle upon Tyne, to demise or lease Part of the Land belonging to the said Vicarage to William Lowes Esquire, for the Purposes, and upon the Conditions, in such Lease to be mentioned.
Titcombe or Tidcombe (Wiltshire) inclosure.	14 Geo. 3. c. 68 Pr.	20 May 1774
An Act for dividing and enclosing certain Open and Common Fields; Commonable Down Lands, and other Commonable Places, in the Parish of Titcombe, otherwise Tidcombe, in the County of Wilts.
Bainton inclosure and for compensating for all Bainton and Neswick (Yorkshire, East Riding) tithes.	14 Geo. 3. c. 69 Pr.	20 May 1774
An Act for dividing and enclosing the several Open Fields, Meadows, Pastures, and other un-enclosed Grounds, within the Township of Bainton, in the East Riding of the County of York; and for making a Compensation in Lieu of the Tithes of all the said Township, and of the Township of Neswick, in the Parish of Bainton aforesaid.
Defford inclosure and drainage and for regulating the stocking with cattle of Defford Common.	14 Geo. 3. c. 70 Pr.	20 May 1774
An Act for dividing and enclosing several Open and Common Fields, and Common Meadows, within the Hamlet or Chapelry of Desford, in the County of Worcester; and for draining and levelling, and also for regulating the Stocking with Cattle, a certain Common called Defford Common.
Garton Inclosure Act 1774	14 Geo. 3. c. 71 Pr.	20 May 1774
An Act for dividing, allotting, and enclosing, the Open un-enclosed Fields and Parcels of Land, within the Manor and Parish of Garton, in the East Riding of the County of York.
Finningley Inclosure Act 1774	14 Geo. 3. c. 72 Pr.	20 May 1774
An Act for dividing and enclosing the Open Arable Fields, Meadows, Pastures, Commons, and Waste Grounds, in the Parish of Finningley, in the Counties of Nottingham and York.
Ellington Inclosure Act 1774	14 Geo. 3. c. 73 Pr.	20 May 1774
An Act for dividing and enclosing the Open and Common Fields, Meadows, Commonable Lands, and Commons, within the Manor, Parish, and Liberties of Ellington, in the County of Huntingdon.
Potton Inclosure Act 1774	14 Geo. 3. c. 74 Pr.	20 May 1774
An Act for enclosing the Open and Common Fields, and Common and Waste Grounds, within the Parish of Potton, in the County of Bedford.
Harringworth Inclosure Act 1774	14 Geo. 3. c. 75 Pr.	20 May 1774
An Act for dividing and enclosing the Open and Common Fields, Meadows, and Common Grounds, within the Parish of Harringworth, in the County of Northampton.
Stoke Hammond Inclosure Act 1774	14 Geo. 3. c. 76 Pr.	20 May 1774
An Act for dividing and enclosing the Open and Common Fields, Common Meadows, and Common and Waste Grounds, and also a Stinted or Common Pasture, called The Cow Common, within the Manor and Parish of Stoke Hammond, in the County of Bucks.
Milton Inclosure Act 1774	14 Geo. 3. c. 77 Pr.	20 May 1774
An Act for dividing and enclosing the Open and Common Fields, and Common Downs, in the Tithings of Milton Lilburne, Milton Abbotts, and Milton Havering, in the Parish of Milton, in the County of Wilts.
Bricklehampton Inclosure Act 1774	14 Geo. 3. c. 78 Pr.	20 May 1774
An Act for dividing and enclosing the Open and Common Fields, Meadows, Pastures, and other Commonable Lands and Grounds, within and belonging to the Chapelry or Township of Bricklehampton in the County of Worcester.
Rudston Inclosure Act 1774	14 Geo. 3. c. 79 Pr.	20 May 1774
An Act for dividing and enclosing the several Open Arable Fields, and other un-enclosed Grounds, within the Township of Rudston, in the East Riding of the County of York.
Easton Inclosure Act 1774	14 Geo. 3. c. 80 Pr.	20 May 1774
An Act for dividing, allotting, and enclosing, the Open and Common Fields, Meadows, Commonable Lands, and Commons, within the Township, Parish, and Liberties of Easton, in the County of Huntingdon.
Acomb and Holgate Inclosure Act 1774	14 Geo. 3. c. 81 Pr.	20 May 1774
An Act for dividing and enclosing several Open Common Fields, Common Pastures, Ings, Commons, and other Waste Lands and Grounds, within the Townships of Acombe and Holdgate, in the County of the City of York.
Oxenton Inclosure Act 1774	14 Geo. 3. c. 82 Pr.	20 May 1774
An Act for dividing and enclosing the Open and Common Fields, Hills, Meadow, Pastures, Lot Grounds, and Commonable Lands, within the Parish of Oxenton, in the County of Gloucester.
St. Neots Inclosure Act 1774	14 Geo. 3. c. 83 Pr.	20 May 1774
An Act to explain and amend an Act, made in the Tenth Year of His present Majesty's Reign, (Note: St. Neots (Huntingdonshire) Inclosure Act 1770 (10 Geo. 3. c. 64 Pr.)) for dividing and enclosing the Open Common Fields, Common Pastures, and other Commonable Lands and Grounds, within the Parish of Saint Neots, in the County of Huntingdon; and for regulating the Usage and Stocking of divers Commonable Lands and Commons within the said Parish.
Medows' Name Act 1774	14 Geo. 3. c. 84 Pr.	20 May 1774
An Act to enable John Medows the elder, Gentleman, and his Issue Male, to take, use, and bear, the Surname and Arms of Theobald, pursuant to the Will of Elizabeth Theobald, Widow, deceased.
Burnand's Naturalization Act 1774	14 Geo. 3. c. 85 Pr.	20 May 1774
An Act for naturalizing Paul Burnand.
Naturalization of Hoffham and Hane.	14 Geo. 3. c. 86 Pr.	20 May 1774
An Act for naturalizing Luder Hoffham and Nicholas Hane.
Busigny's Naturalization Act 1774	14 Geo. 3. c. 87 Pr.	20 May 1774
An Act for naturalizing Victor Busigny.
Hanger's Estate Act 1774	14 Geo. 3. c. 88 Pr.	2 June 1774
An Act for vesting the Estate of the Honourable William Hanger, situate in the County of Kent, entailed by the Will of the Right Honourable Gabriel Lord Coleraine, in the Kingdom of Ireland, deceased, in Trustees to be sold; and for applying the Monies arising by such Sale in the Purchase of other Lands and Hereditaments, to be settled to the same Uses.
St. Aubyn's Estate Act 1774	14 Geo. 3. c. 89 Pr.	2 June 1774
An Act for vesting One Moiety of the Bridge built cross Stonehouse Creek, near Plymouth Dock, in the County of Devon, in Trustees, in Trust to raise a Moiety of the Expences of building the same; and also for enabling certain Persons to grant Building and other Leases during the Minority of Sir John Saint Aubyn Baronet, of the respective Estates devised to him by the Wills of his Father and Sir William Morice Baronet, deceased; and likewise for vesting certain Houses in Middlesex and London, in Trustees, in Trust to sell the same.
Gee's Estate Act 1774	14 Geo. 3. c. 90 Pr.	2 June 1774
An Act for vesting the Manor of Thorngumbald, and certain Messuages, Lands, Tenements, and Hereditaments, in Thorngumbald and Paul, or One of them, in Holderness, in the East Riding of the County of York, late the Estate of Thomas Gee Esquire, deceased, in Trustees, to be sold; and for applying Part of the Monies thereby arising in discharging the Incumbrances affecting the same Estate; and for laying out the Residue in the Purchase of other Lands and Hereditaments, to be settled to the same Uses.
Enabling Walter Smyth to establish an exchange of the manor of Binderton and lands in Binderton (Sussex) for lands in said parish belonging to Sir James Peachy.	14 Geo. 3. c. 91 Pr.	2 June 1774
An Act to enable Walter Smyth Esquire to make and establish an Exchange of the Manor of Binderton, and certain Lands, Tenements, and Hereditaments, in the Parish of Binderton, in the County of Sussex, for other Lands and Hereditaments in the same County belonging to Sir James Peachey Baronet.
Timberland Inclosure Act 1774	14 Geo. 3. c. 92 Pr.	2 June 1774
An Act for dividing and enclosing the Open and Common Fields. Commons, Fens, and Waste Grounds, in the Parish of Timberland, in the County of Lincoln.
Rawmarsh Inclosure Act 1774	14 Geo. 3. c. 93 Pr.	2 June 1774
An Act for dividing and enclosing the Common Fields, Common Ings, Mesne Enclosures, Commons, or Waste Grounds, within the Parish of Rawmarsh, in the West Riding of the County of York.
Lange's Naturalization Act 1774	14 Geo. 3. c. 94 Pr.	2 June 1774
An Act for naturalizing John Michael Lange.
Richard Earl of Burlington and Corke's estates in Yorkshire: empowering William Duke of Devonshire to make leases of mines and quarries.	14 Geo. 3. c. 95 Pr.	14 June 1774
An Act for empowering the Most Noble William Duke of Devonshire, to make Leases of Mines and Quarries, within the Estates late of Richard Earl of Burlington and Corke, deceased, in the County of York.
Lord Chedworth's Estate Act 1774	14 Geo. 3. c. 96 Pr.	14 June 1774
An Act for vesting a Messuage and Lands called East Leach Grove, (Part of the Settled Estate of the Right Honourable Frederick Henry Lord Chedworth, in the County of Gloucester), in Trustees, in Trust to sell and convey the same, pursuant to an Agreement for that Purpose; and for laying out the Money arising by such Sale in the Purchase of other Lands, to be settled to the like Uses.
Swinburne's Estate Act 1774	14 Geo. 3. c. 97 Pr.	14 June 1774
An Act to enable Sir Edward Swinburne Baronet to charge certain Moors and Waste Lands within the Parishes of Edlingham and Simonburne, in the County of Northumberland, or either of them, late the Estate of Sir John Swinburne Baronet, deceased, after he shall have cultivated and improved the same in the Manner therein mentioned.
Barbor's Estate Act 1774	14 Geo. 3. c. 98 Pr.	14 June 1774
An Act for vesting divers Freehold Estates, late of Robert Barbor Esquire, deceased, in Trustees to be sold to raise Money, to be applied under the Direction of the Court of Chancery, in Payment of the Debts, Legacies, and Charges, charged upon and affecting the same; and for other the Purposes therein mentioned.
Carstairs' Estate Act 1774	14 Geo. 3. c. 99 Pr.	14 June 1774
An Act for empowering the Judges of the Court of Session in Scotland, to sell the Whole, or such Parts and Portions of the Estate and Barony of Kinross, in the County of Kinross, belonging to James Bruce Carstairs Esquire, as shall be sufficient for Payment of the Debts affecting the same; and for settling the Remainder of the said Estate and Barony in Tail, on the same Persons, and to the same Uses and Purposes, as mentioned in a Deed of Entail made by Sir William Bruce Baronet, bearing Date the Sixteenth Day of February in the Year One thousand six hundred and eighty-three.
Smith's Estate Act 1774	14 Geo. 3. c. 100 Pr.	14 June 1774
An Act to enable certain Trustees therein named to raise Money by Sale of certain Estates of John Smith, and James Smith his Son, in the City of Coventry, and County of the same City, for the Payment of Debts and Incumbrances, and other Purposes therein expressed.
Sterne's Estate Act 1774	14 Geo. 3. c. 101 Pr.	14 June 1774
An Act for amending, and rendering effectual, the Powers of Sale and Revocation of Uses contained in the Marriage Articles and Settlement of Richard Sterne Esquire, and Mary his Wife, of divers Messuages, Lands, and Hereditaments, in the County of York, therein comprised.
Baker's Estate Act 1774	14 Geo. 3. c. 102 Pr.	14 June 1774
An Act for enabling and empowering Trustees to accept, grant, and make, Building and other Leases, Contracts, and Agreements, of certain Messuages, Lands, and Premises, late of William Baker Esquire, deceased, during the Minority of his Son Peter William Baker, an Infant; and also during such Minority to receive the Rents and Profits thereof, and all other his Personal Estates, and the Interest, Dividends, and Proceed thereof, and apply the same as in the Act mentioned; and for other Purposes.
Colebrooke's Estate Act 1774	14 Geo. 3. c. 103 Pr.	14 June 1774
An Act for vesting the Estates, late of James Colebrooke Esquire, deceased, in the County of Kent, in Trustees to be sold, and for purchasing other Estates to be settled to the same Uses, subject to the Annuities, and other Charges and Incumbrances thereon; and for other Purposes therein mentioned.
Enabling Balliol College Oxford to convey lands and possessions in Salop. and Radnorshire to William Pearce Hall and John Woodhouse in exchange for lands in Radnorshire.	14 Geo. 3. c. 104 Pr.	14 June 1774
An Act to enable the Master and Scholars of Baliol College in the University of Oxford, in their Collegiate Capacity, to convey certain Lands and Possessions belonging to the said College in the Counties of Salop and Radnor, to William Pearce Hall and John Woodhouse Esquires, in Exchange for other Lands in the County of Radnor of greater Value, to be conveyed to and held by them respectively to the Uses and upon the Trusts therein mentioned.
Newcastle upon Tyne Town Moor Act 1774 (repealed)	14 Geo. 3. c. 105 Pr.	14 June 1774
An Act for confirming to the resident Freemen or Burgesses, and resident Widows of deceased Freemen or Burgesses of the Town of Newcastle upon Tyne, their full Right and Benefit to the Herbage of The Town Moor, Castle Leazes, and Nuns Moor, within the Liberties of the said Town, for Two Milch Cows each, in such Manner as has been used; and for improving the Herbage of the said Town Moor, Castle Leazes, and Nuns Moor, respectively. (Repealed by Newcastle upon Tyne Town Moor Act 1988 (c.xxxi))
Wedmore Inclosure Act 1774	14 Geo. 3. c. 106 Pr.	14 June 1774
An Act for dividing and enclosing the Commons or Wastes, called or known by the Names of Wedmore Moor, Churchland Moor, Tadam and Yeel Moor, and Mudgeley Moor, within the Parish of Wedmore, in the County of Somerset.
Confirming and establishing the division, extinction of right of intercommon and exchanges of certain lands in Balmbrough, Shoeston and Sunderland (Northumberland) made between several persons and for appointing arbitrators to settle the Lord of Hexham and Blanchland (Northumberland) manors' claims to disputed ground lying contiguous to said manors.	14 Geo. 3. c. 107 Pr.	14 June 1774
An Act for confirming and establishing the Division, Extinction of Right of Intercommon and Exchanges of certain Lands in Balmbrough, Shoeston, and Sunderland, in the County of Northumberland, made between the several Persons interested therein; and for appointing Arbitrators to settle the Claims of the respective Lords of the Manors of Hexham and Blanchland, in the said County, to a Tract of disputed Ground lying contiguous to the said Manors.
Hellidon Inclosure Act 1774	14 Geo. 3. c. 108 Pr.	14 June 1774
An Act for dividing and enclosing the Open and Common Fields, Common Pastures, Common Meadows, and other Commonable Lands, of and within the Parish and Liberties of Hellidon, in the County of Northampton.
Hollowell Inclosure Act 1774	14 Geo. 3. c. 109 Pr.	14 June 1774
An Act for dividing and enclosing the Open and Common Fields, Common Heath, Common Pastures, Common Meadows, and other Commonable Lands, of and within the Hamlet and Liberties of Hollowell, in the Parish of Guilsborough, in the County of Northampton.
Graffham Inclosure Act 1774	14 Geo. 3. c. 110 Pr.	14 June 1774
An Act for dividing and enclosing the Open and Common Fields, Meadows, Commonable Lands; and Commons, within the Manor and Township of Grassham, in the County of Huntingdon.
Popham's Divorce Act 1774	14 Geo. 3. c. 111 Pr.	14 June 1774
An Act to dissolve the Marriage of Stephen Popham Gentleman with Ann Yate Whiteside his now Wife, and to enable him to marry again; and for other Purposes therein mentioned.
George Dickerdine: change of name and surname to Rice Fellowe, and licence to bear the arms of Fellowe, pursuant to the will of Rice Fellowe.	14 Geo. 3. c. 112 Pr.	14 June 1774
An Act to enable George Dickerdine Esquire, and his Heirs, to take and use the Name and Surname of Rice Fellowe, and to bear the Arms of Fellowe, pursuant to the Will of Rice Fellowe Esquire, deceased.
Bathwick Roads and Bridge, etc. Act 1774	14 Geo. 3. c. 113 Pr.	22 June 1774
An Act to enable the Trustees named in a certain Act of Parliament, passed in the Twelfth Year of the Reign of His present Majesty, (Note: Bathwick Roads and Bridge, etc. Act 1772 (12 Geo. 3. c. 131 Pr.)) intituled, "An Act for giving further Powers to the Trustees named in a certain Act of Parliament made in the Ninth Year of the Reign of His present Majesty, (Note: Bathwick Roads and Bridge, etc. Act 1769 (9 Geo. 3. c. 95)) intituled, 'An Act to empower the Trustees of the Will of the late General Pulteney, and other Trustees, appointed by this Act, to purchase and exchange Lands and Grounds in the Manor of Bathwick, in the County of Somerset, for the Purpose of making certain Roads and Ways to and from a Free Bridge, by them intended to be built over the River Avon, in the said County; and also to empower the Persons in Possession of the said Estate for the Time being, under the said Will, to grant Leases of certain Lands and Houses in the said Manor; and likewise to enable the said Trustees to grant certain. Grounds and Springs of Water, within the said Manor of Bathwuk, to the Mayor, Aldermen, and Citizens of Bath; and for extending the Jurisdiction of the said Mayor, Aldermen, and Citizens, over Part of the said Manor of Bathwick; and for other Purposes therein mentioned;' and for enlarging the Powers of Leasing, given by the said Act to the Persons therein named; and for other Purposes; to raise a Sum of Money for the Purposes therein mentioned.
Laleham Inclosure Act 1774	14 Geo. 3. c. 114 Pr.	22 June 1774
An Act for allotting and dividing the Open Fields and Commons, in the Manor of Laleham, in the Counties of Middlesex and Surrey.

=== Sources ===
- Pickering, Danby, ed. (1773). "Anno decimo quarto Georgii III". Statutes at Large. Vol. 30: To the End of the Thirteenth Parliament of Great Britain. Cambridge: Charles Bathurst. pp. 325–594 – via Internet Archive.
- Pickering, Danby, ed. (1773). "Anno decimo quarto Georgii III". Statutes at Large. Vol. 30: To the End of the Thirteenth Parliament of Great Britain. Cambridge: Charles Bathurst. pp. 325–594 – via Google Books.
- Pickering, Danby, ed. (1773). "Anno decimo quarto Georgii III". Statutes at Large. Vol. 30: To the End of the Thirteenth Parliament of Great Britain. Cambridge: Charles Bathurst. pp. 325–594 – via Internet Archive.
- Journals of the House of Commons. Vol. 34. London: His Majesty's Stationery Office. 1804. pp. 391–821 – via Google Books.
- Chronological Table of and Index to the Statutes. Vol. 1: To the End of the Session 59 Vict. Sess. 2 (1895) (13th ed.). London: Her Majesty's Stationery Office. 1896. pp. 129–131 – via Google Books.
- "Acts of the Parliament of Great Britain from 1774". legislation.gov.uk. The National Archives.

== See also ==
- List of acts of the Parliament of Great Britain
