= Great Recoinage =

The Great Recoinage may refer to either of the following events in the history of British coinage.

- The Great Recoinage of 1696, which was conducted to address problems with the silver coins then in currency, such as clipping and arbitrage.
- The Great Recoinage of 1816, which reintroduced silver coinage for values up to £2 and replaced the Guinea with the Sovereign.
