= Mint Act 1817 =

Act of the Parliament of the United Kingdom

- Act of Parliament
- Parliament of the United Kingdom
- Long title: An Act to regulate certain Offices in, and abolish others in His Majesty's mints in England and Scotland respectively.
- Citation: 57 Geo. 3. c. 67
- Territorial extent: United Kingdom

Dates
- Royal assent: 7 July 1817
- Commencement: 7 July 1817 (Note: Section 1.)
- Repealed: 4 April 1870
Other legislation
| Amends | Weights for Coin in the Mint Act 1774 |
| Repealed by | Coinage Act 1870 |

Status: Repealed

Text of statute as originally enacted

The Mint Act 1817 (57 Geo. 3. c. 67) was an act of the Parliament of the United Kingdom which changed the organisational structure of the mints in England and Scotland which today make up the Royal Mint. The act's full title was "An Act to regulate certain offices in, and abolish others in his majesty's mints in England and Scotland respectively."

The act stipulated that after the termination of the last Warden of the Mint in England (Sir Walter James, 1st Baronet) and the last Governor of the Mint in Scotland, both offices would be abolished with the Warden's duties becoming those of Master and Worker and Scottish mint responsibilities held by the English Master of the Mint.

== Subsequent developments ==
The whole act was repealed by section 20 of, and the second part of the second schedule to, the Coinage Act 1870 (33 & 34 Vict. c. 10), which came into force on 4 April 1870.
