= Joseph Dunn (entrepreneur) =

English priest and entrepreneur (1746–1827)

Rev. Joseph "Daddy" Dunn (1746–1827) was an English priest and entrepreneur who was noted for his importing and distribution of gas throughout the United Kingdom, mainly the Preston area. Dunn rapidly changed the whole of Lancashire by transporting coal-gas lighting into the area.

== Business career ==
Through being a Jesuit priest, he had many contacts all over the country, as well as some abroad, it was through these contacts that he was informed about business people who could give him the methods to import gas to the Preston area.

=== Improved Lighting ===
Through chemical experiments, he had formulated a better gas lighting technique, for longer power and brightness and in 1816, he had enough confidence in himself and his idea to start the Preston Gaslight Company.

=== Business Success ===
By the mid-1820s, due to his company, Preston became the second town in England after London to be fully lit by coal gas. His company offices were situated in Avenham.
