= Coinage Act 1870 =

Act of the Parliament of the United Kingdom

Coinage Act 1870 (Note: Section 1.)
- Act of Parliament
- Parliament of the United Kingdom
- Long title: An Act to consolidate and amend the law relating to the Coinage and Her Majesty's Mint
- Citation: 33 & 34 Vict. c. 10
- Introduced by: George Glyn (Commons)
- Territorial extent: Does not extend to any British possession, save as expressly provided by the act, or by any proclamation made thereunder. (Note: Section 19.)

Dates
- Royal assent: 4 April 1870
- Commencement: 4 April 1870 (Note: The Acts of Parliament (Commencement) Act 1793.)
- Repealed: 1 September 1971 (Note: Section 14(2). The Decimal Currency (End of Transitional Period) Order 1971.)
Other legislation
Amends	Quality and Marks of Silver Work Act 1423; Standards of Weights, Measures, and Coinage Act 1866
Repeals/revokes	See § Repealed enactments
Amended by	Gold Standard Act 1925; Statute Law Revision Act 1953; Decimal Currency Act 1969
Repealed by	Coinage Act 1971

Status: Repealed

Text of statute as originally enacted

The Coinage Act 1870 (33 & 34 Vict. c. 10) was an act of the Parliament of the United Kingdom. It stated the metric weights of British coins. For example, it defined the weight of the sovereign as 7.98805 grams (about 123.27747 grains).

The act also vested the titles of Master of the Mint and 'Governor of the Mint of Scotland', which had ceased minting coins in 1707, in the Chancellor of the Exchequer.

The act also gave the British government the authority to establish overseas branches of the Mint in British possessions. In 1907, the government used that power to establish a branch of the Mint in Ottawa, at the request of the Canadian government. It repealed the authorization in 1931, when the Mint in Ottawa came under full Canadian control.

A contemporary history suggests that the act was influenced by the criticisms of George Frederick Ansell.

== Passage ==
Leave to bring in the Coinage Bill to the House of Commons was granted to the Chancellor of the Exchequer, Robert Lowe MP and the Financial Secretary to the Treasury, James Stansfeld MP on 10 February 1870. The bill had its first reading in the House of Commons on 10 February, presented by the Parliamentary Secretary to the Treasury, George Glyn MP. The bill had its second reading in the House of Commons on 25 February 1870 and was committed to a committee of the whole house, which met and reported on 1 March 1870, with amendments. The amended bill was re-committed to a committee of the whole house, which met and reported on 10 March 1870, with amendments. The amended bill was considered on 12 March 1870 and had its third reading in the House of Commons on 14 March 1870 and passed, without amendments.

The bill had its first reading in the House of Lords on 15 March 1870. The bill had its second reading in the House of Lords on 18 March 1870 and was committed to a committee of the whole house, which met on 22 March 1870 and reported on 24 March 1870, with amendments. The amended bill had its third reading in the House of Lords on 25 March 1870 and passed, without amendments.

The amended bill was considered and agreed to by the House of Commons on 1 April 1870.

The bill was granted royal assent on 4 April 1870.

== Provisions ==
=== Repealed enactments ===
Section 20 of the act repealed 24 enactments, wholly for those listed in the first part of the second schedule to the act, and in part for those listed in the second part of second schedule to the act.

Citation	Short title	Description	Extent of repeal
2 Hen. 6. c. 17	Quality and Marks of Silver Work Act 1423	For regulating and ascertaining the fineness of silver work.	So much as relates to the master of the Mint.
29 & 30 Vict. c. 82	Standards of Weights, Measures, and Coinage Act 1866	An Act to amend the Acts relating to the standard weights and measures, and to the standard trial pieces of the coin of the realm.	Section thirteen.
18 & 19 Cha. 2. c. 5.	Coin Act 1666	An Act for encouraging of coinage.	The whole act.
6 Anne, c. 57.	Coinage in American Plantations Act 1707	An Act for ascertaining the rates of foreign coins in Her Majesty's plantations in America.	The whole act.
13 Geo. 3. c. 57.	Paper Currency in America Act 1772	An Act to explain and amend an Act made in the fourth year of His present Majesty, intituled "An Act to prevent paper bills of credit hereafter to be issued in any of His Majesty's colonies or plantations in America from being declared to be a legal tender in payments of money, and to prevent the legal tender of such bills as are now subsisting from being prolonged beyond the periods limited for calling in and sinking the same."	The whole act.
14 Geo. 3. c. 70.	Coin Act 1774	An Act for applying a certain sum of money for calling in and recoining the deficient gold coin of this realm; and for regulating the manner of receiving the same at the Bank of England, and of taking there an account of the deficiency of the said coin and making satisfaction for the same; and for authorising all persons to cut and deface all gold coin that shall not be allowed to be current by His Majesty's proclamation.	The whole act.
14 Geo. 3. c. 92.	Weights for Coin in the Mint Act 1774	An Act for regulating and ascertaining the weights to be made use of in weighing the gold and silver coin of this kingdom.	The whole act.
15 Geo. 3. c. 30.	Weights for Coin in the Mint Act 1775	An Act for allowing the officer appointed to mark or stamp the weights to be made use of in weighing the gold and silver coin of this kingdom, in pursuance of an Act made in the last session of Parliament, to take certain fees in the execution of his office.	The whole act.
39 Geo. 3. c. 94.	Master of the Mint Act 1799	An Act to ascertain the salary of the master and worker of His Majesty's Mint.	The whole act.
52 Geo. 3. c. 138.	Counterfeiting Tokens, etc. Act 1812	An Act for the further prevention of the counterfeiting of silver tokens issued by the Governor and Company of the Bank of England called dollars, and of silver pieces issued and circulated by the said Governor and Company called tokens, and for the further prevention of frauds practised by the imitation of the notes or bills of the said Governor and Company.	The whole act.
52 Geo. 3. c. 157.	Tokens Act 1812	An Act to prevent the issuing and circulating of pieces of gold and silver or other metal, usually called tokens, except such as are issued by the Banks of England and Ireland respectively.	The whole act.
54 Geo. 3. c. 4.	Tokens Act 1813	An Act to continue until six weeks after the commencement of the next session of Parliament an Act passed in the last session of Parliament, intituled "An Act to continue and amend an Act of the present session, to prevent the issuing and circulation of pieces of gold and silver or other metal, usually called tokens, except such as are issued by the Banks of England and Ireland respectively."	The whole act.
56 Geo. 3. c. 68.	Coinage Act 1816	An Act to provide for a new silver coinage, and to regulate the currency of the gold and silver coin of this realm.	The whole act.
57 Geo. 3. c. 46.	Tokens Act 1817	An Act to prevent the issuing and circulating of pieces of copper or other metal usually called tokens.	The whole act.
57 Geo. 3. c. 67.	Mint Act 1817	An Act to regulate certain offices, and abolish others, in His Majesty's Mints in England and Scotland respectively.	The whole act.
57 Geo. 3. c. 113.	Tokens (No. 2) Act 1817	An Act for the further regulation of dollars and tokens issued by the Governor and Company of the Bank of England for the convenience of the public.	The whole act.
6 Geo. 4. c. 79.	Currency Act 1825	An Act to provide for the assimilation of the currency and monies of account throughout the United Kingdom of Great Britain and Ireland.	The whole act.
6 Geo. 4. c. 98.	Tokens Act 1825	An Act to prevent the further circulation of tokens issued by the Governor and Company of the Bank of Ireland for the convenience of the public, and for defraying the expense of exchanging such tokens.	The whole act.
1 & 2 Will. 4. c. 10.	Mint Act 1831	An Act to reduce the salary of the master and worker of His Majesty's Mint.	The whole act.
7 Will. 4. & 1 Vict. c. 9.	Mint Act 1837	An Act to amend several Acts relating to the Royal Mint.	The whole act.
12 & 13 Vict. c. 41.	Coin Act 1849	An Act to extend an Act of the fifty-sixth year of King George the Third, for providing for a new silver coinage, and for regulating the currency of the gold and silver coin of this realm.	The whole act.
22 & 23 Vict. c. 30.	Coinage Act 1859	An Act to extend the enactments relating to the copper coin to coin of mixed metal.	The whole act.
26 & 27 Vict. c. 74.	Sydney Branch Mint Act 1863	An Act to enable Her Majesty to declare gold coins to be issued from Her Majesty's Branch Mint at Sydney, New South Wales, a legal tender for payments; and for other purposes relating thereto.	The whole act.
29 & 30 Vict. c. 65.	Colonial Branch Mint Act 1866	An Act to enable Her Majesty to declare gold coins to be issued from Her Majesty's Colonial Branch Mints a legal tender for payments; and for other purposes relating thereto.	The whole act.

== Subsequent developments ==
In section 20, the words from " The Acts mentioned " to " Provided that ", and the second schedule to the act were repealed for Northern Ireland by section 1 of, and the first schedule to, the Statute Law Revision Act 1953 (2 & 3 Eliz. 2. c. 5), which came into force on 18 December 1953.

The whole act was repealed by section 13 of, and schedule 2 to, the Coinage Act 1971, which came into force on 1 September 1971.

The act was retained for the Republic of Ireland by section 2(2)(a) of, and part 4 of schedule 1 to, the Statute Law Revision Act 2007, which came into force on 8 May 2007.

== See also ==
- Coinage Act
