= Coinage Act 1816 =

Act of the Parliament of the United Kingdom

Coordinates: 51.5542°N 3.3889°W

- Act of Parliament
- Parliament of the United Kingdom
- Long title: An Act to provide for a New Silver Coinage, and to regulate the Currency of the Gold and Silver Coin of this Realm.
- Citation: 56 Geo. 3. c. 68
- Territorial extent: United Kingdom

Dates
- Royal assent: 22 June 1816
- Commencement: 22 June 1816 (Note: Section 1.)
- Repealed: 4 April 1870
Other legislation
Repealed by	Coinage Act 1870

Status: Repealed

Text of statute as originally enacted

The Coinage Act 1816 (56 Geo. 3. c. 68), also known as the Coin Act 1816 or Liverpool's Act, was an act of the Parliament of the United Kingdom that defined the value of the pound sterling relative to gold. One troy pound of standard (22-carat) gold was defined as equivalent to £46 14s 6d., i.e. 44 1/2 guineas, the guinea having been fixed in December 1717 at £1 1s exactly. According to its preamble, the purposes of the act were to:

- prohibit the use of silver coins (which would now be of reduced weight, 66 shillings rather than 62 shillings per troy pound), for transactions larger than 40s
- establish a single gold standard for transactions of all sizes.

== Subsequent developments ==
The whole act was repealed by section 20 of, and the second part of the second schedule to, the Coinage Act 1870 (33 & 34 Vict. c. 10), which came into force on 4 April 1870.

== See also ==
- Great Recoinage of 1816
