= Great Recoinage of 1816 =

Attempted reformation of British currency

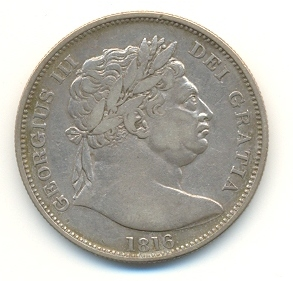
A Bull Head George half crown dating from 1816

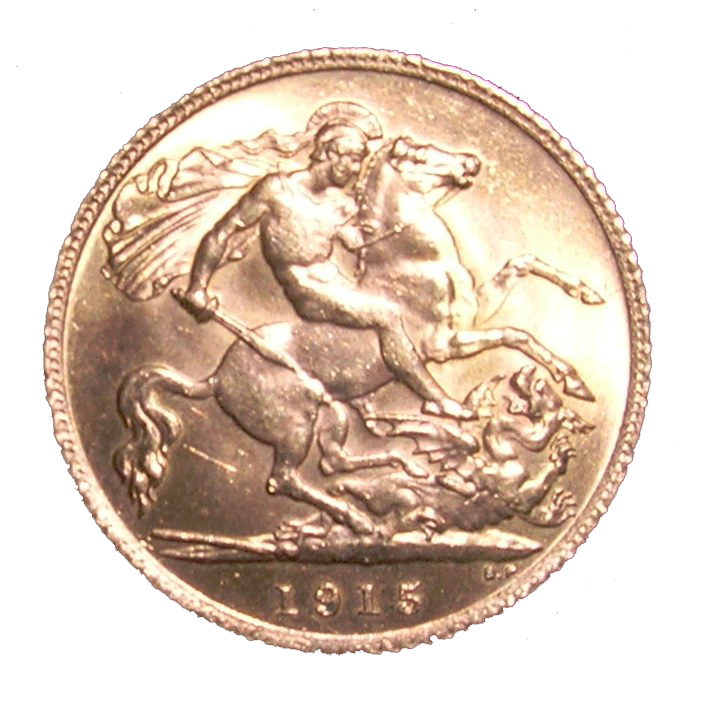
Benedetto Pistrucci's St. George design

The Great Recoinage of 1816 was an attempt by the government of the United Kingdom of Great Britain and Ireland to re-stabilise its currency, the pound sterling, after the economic difficulties brought about by the French Revolutionary Wars and the Napoleonic Wars.

== Background ==
The French Revolutionary Wars (1792–1802) and the Napoleonic Wars (1803–1815) led to financial instability in Britain. This was due to the cost of direct military and economic warfare against France as well as Britain's financing of a series of coalitions opposed to the French Revolutionary and Napoleonic regimes. In exchange for large cash subsidies from Britain, nations such as Austria, Prussia and Russia, with armies larger than Britain's, fought against France. The period's economic conflicts, such as Napoleon's Continental System and Britain's retaliatory measures against it, disrupted trade and the availability of markets in Europe for the products of Britain's growing mercantile and colonial empires. Finally, insufficient supplies of silver and copper led to a shortage of coins.

Privately owned banks in Great Britain and Ireland had long been free to issue their own banknotes, but as gold shortages affected the supply of money, the note-issuing powers of the banks were gradually limited by various Acts of Parliament, until the Bank Charter Act 1844 limited the issuance by English and Welsh banks of non-gold-backed Bank of England notes to up to £14 million. (Note: Equivalent to £1.88 billion in 2023.) The English private banknote eventually disappeared, leaving the Bank of England with a monopoly of note issue in England.

Local tokens were produced by companies and banks all over the country. Despite an increase in trade, the national debt had increased by 100% by the start of the 19th century. A series of bad harvests pushed up food prices and this culminated in riots in 1801–02.

Corn prices (Note: In British usage, "corn" is a general term for any staple grain.) halved at the end of the wars, when trade with Europe resumed. The Corn Laws of 1815 were intended to protect the price of domestic grain, but this kept grain prices high and depressed the domestic market for manufactured goods, because people had to use so much of their money to buy food. Likewise, European countries that relied on exporting corn to Britain in order to buy British manufactured goods were no longer able to do so.

The government needed to find a way to stabilise the currency, and the Great Recoinage was the first step in this process. The main aims were the reintroduction of a silver coinage and a change in the gold coinage from the guinea valued at 21 shillings to the slightly lighter sovereign worth 20 shillings. The value of the shilling remained unchanged at twelve pence.

This massive recoinage programme by the Royal Mint created standard gold sovereigns and circulating crowns and half-crowns containing the now famous image of St. George and the Dragon by the Italian engraver Benedetto Pistrucci, and eventually copper farthings in 1821. Pistrucci's initial portrait of George III has become known to collectors as the "bull-head George".

== Specifications ==
The weight of the new gold sovereigns was calculated on the basis that the value of one troy pound of standard (22 carat) gold was £46 14s 6d. (Note: In pre-decimal British currency, or £46.73 (equivalent to £4,520 in 2023).) Sovereigns therefore weighed 123.2745 grains (7.98805 grams). This standard persists to the present day, more than two centuries later. To put a gold standard into effect, and avoid the pitfalls of bimetallism, silver coins were declared legal tender only for sums of money up to 40 shillings. (Note: equivalent to £190 in 2023.)

The recoinage of silver in Great Britain after a long drought produced a burst of coins: the mint struck nearly 40 million shillings between 1816 and 1820, 17 million half-crowns and 1.3 million silver crowns.

The value of one troy pound (weighing 5,760 grains (373 g) of standard sterling silver (0.925 fineness)) was fixed by coining it into 66 shillings (or its equivalent in other denominations). This established the weight of all silver coins (and their cupro-nickel successors), and their decimal new pence replacements, from 1816 until the 1990s, when new smaller coins were introduced.

The silver coins initially produced were shillings weighing 87.2727 grains (5.65518 g), half-crowns of 218.1818 gr (14.13794 g) and crowns of 436.3636 gr (28.27589 g). Over the many reigns until decimalisation other denominations came and went, such as the threepence, sixpence, florin, and double florin, always weighing exactly one troy pound per 66 shillings (irrespective of fineness, which was reduced to 50% in 1920, and to 0% in 1947). This made 5 sterling silver shillings (which is 1 crown), about the weight of .9091 troy ounces (28.28 g) of sterling silver.

== See also ==
- Coinage Act 1816
