= Coinage Act =

Stock short title used for legislation

Coinage Act is a stock short title used for legislation in India, the United Kingdom, and the United States related to coinage.

== List ==
=== India ===
- Indian Coinage Act, 1870 (23 of 1870)
- Indian Coinage and Paper Currency Act, 1899, (22 of 1899)
- Indian Coinage Act, 1906 (3 of 1906)
- Gold Coinage Act, 1918 (14 of 1918)
- Coinage Act, 2011(11 of 2011)

=== United Kingdom ===
- Coinage Act 1816 (56 Geo. 3. c. 68), defined the value of a pound relative to gold
- Coinage Offences Act 1861 (24 & 25 Vict. c. 99)
- Coinage Act 1870 (33 & 34 Vict. c. 10), stated the metric weights of British coins
- Coinage Act 1891 (54 & 55 Vict. c. 72)
- Coinage Act 1920 (10 & 11 Geo. 5 c. 3)
- Coinage Act 1946 (9 & 10 Geo. 6 c. 74)
- Coinage Act 1971 (c. 24)
- Coinage (Measurement) Act 2011 (c. 17), amended the Coinage Act 1971 to allow the method for measuring and confirming the weight of coins to be set by proclamation

=== United States ===
- Coinage Act of 1792, established the U.S. dollar and Mint and defined coinage standards; silver-to-gold ratio set at 15:1
- Coinage Act of 1834, altered the silver-to-gold ratio to 16:1
- Coinage Act of 1849, created two new denominations of gold coins, $1 and $20
- Coinage Act of 1853, reduced the silver in half-dollar, quarter, dime, and half-dime coins; authorized a $3 gold coin
- Coinage Act of 1857, forbid use of foreign coins as legal tender, reduced the size of the cent, ended the half-cent coin
- Coinage Act of 1864, mandated that the inscription "In God We Trust" be placed on all coins minted as United States currency
- Coinage Act of 1873, made the U.S. Mint part of the Treasury Department; silver demonetized, three minor coins terminated
- Coinage Act of 1965, effectively ended the mintage of circulating silver coins.

== See also ==
- List of short titles
- Coinage Offences Act
