= Three-dollar piece =

US three-dollar coin (1854–1889)

Three-dollar piece ($3)
- United States
- Value: 3 United States dollars
- Mass: 5.015 g
- Diameter: 20.5 mm (.807 in)
- Edge: reeded
- Composition: 90% gold, 10% copper
- Gold: .1451 troy oz
- Years of minting: 1854–1889
- Mint marks: D, O, S. Found immediately below the wreath on the reverse. Philadelphia Mint pieces lack mint mark.

Obverse
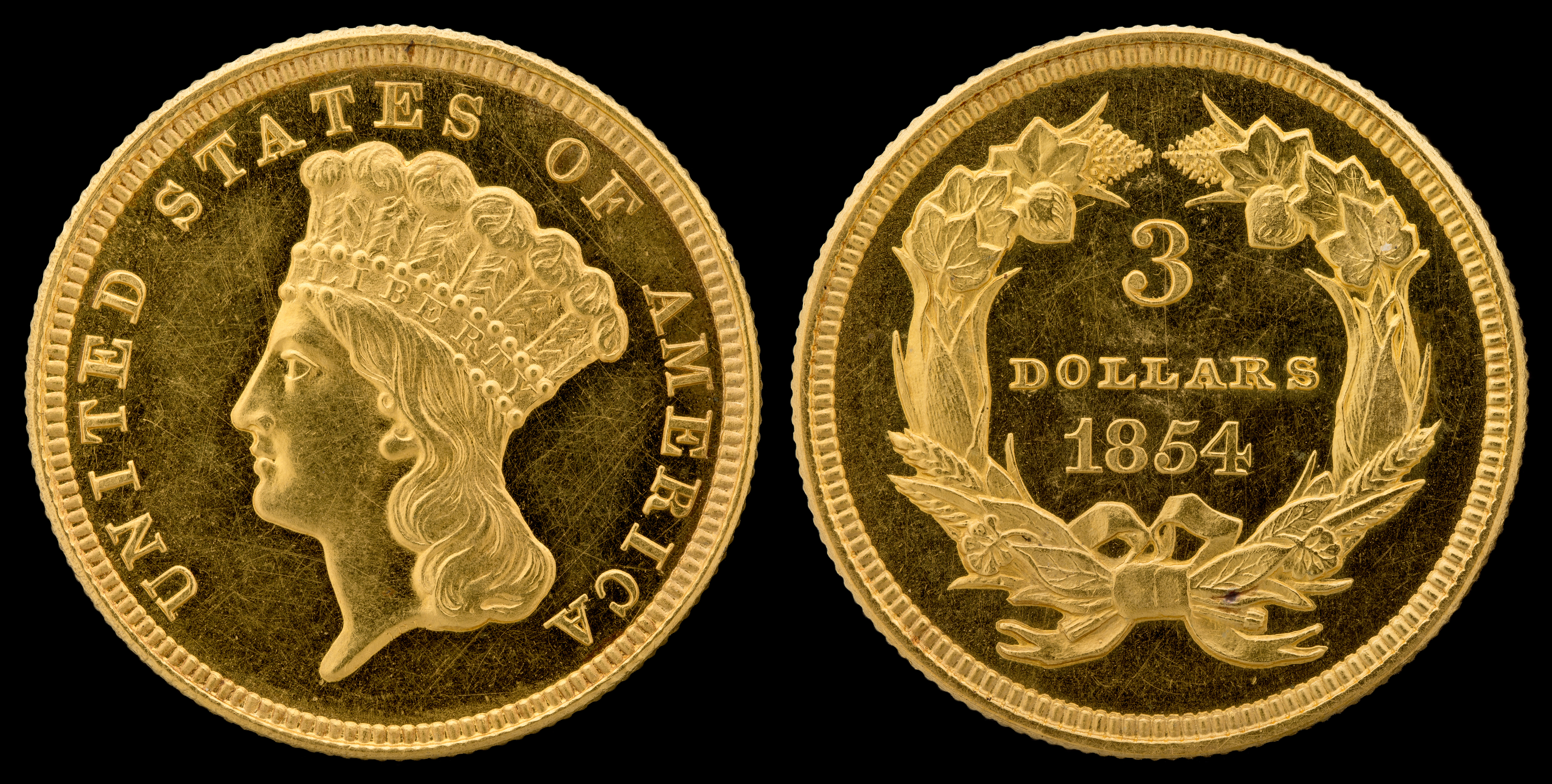
- Design: Liberty as a Native American princess
- Designer: James B. Longacre
- Design date: 1854
- Design discontinued: 1889

Reverse
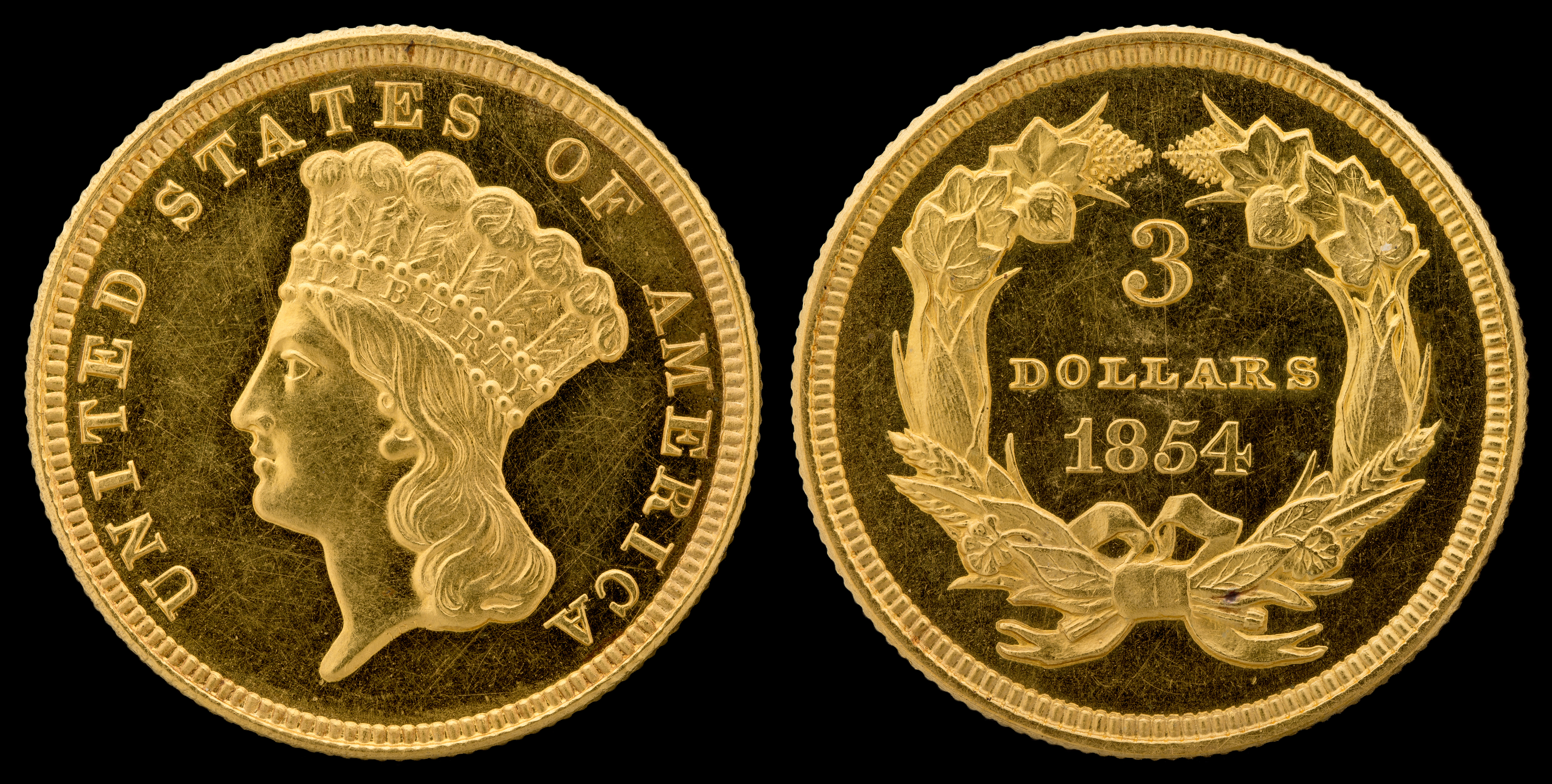
- Design: Small "Dollars"
- Designer: James B. Longacre
- Design date: 1854
- Design discontinued: 1854
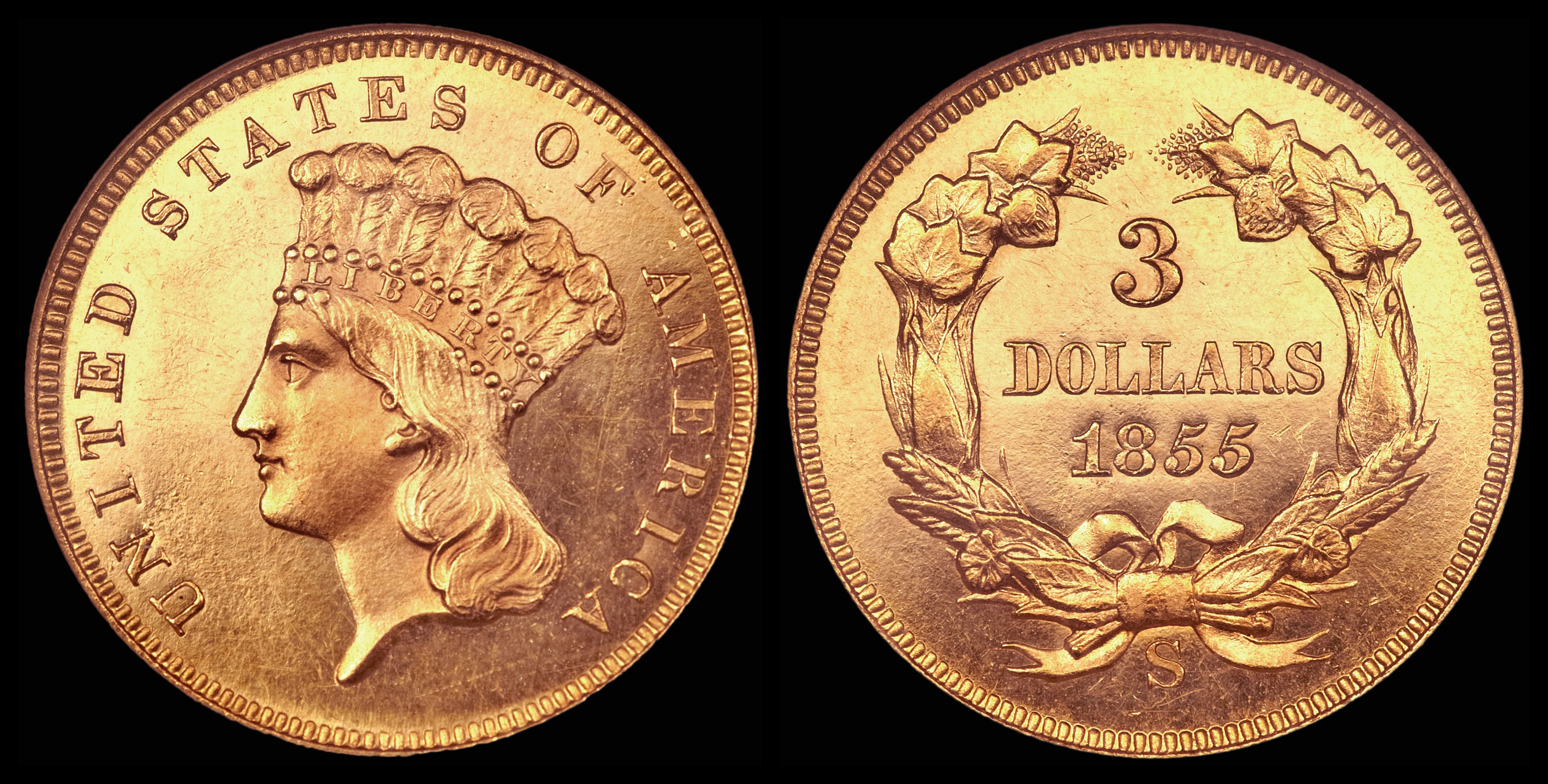
- Design: Large "Dollars"
- Designer: James B. Longacre
- Design date: 1855
- Design discontinued: 1889

The three-dollar piece was a gold coin produced by the United States Bureau of the Mint from 1854 to 1889. Authorized by the Act of February 21, 1853, the coin was designed by Mint Chief Engraver James B. Longacre. The obverse bears a representation of Lady Liberty wearing a headdress of a Native American princess and the reverse a wreath of corn, wheat, cotton, and tobacco.

In 1851, Congress had authorized a silver three-cent piece so that postage stamps of that value could be purchased without using the widely disliked copper cents. Two years later, a bill was passed which authorized a three-dollar coin. By some accounts, the three-dollar coin was introduced to make it easier to buy a full sheet of 100 three-cent stamps in a single transaction. Longacre, in designing the piece, sought to make it as different as possible from the quarter eagle or $2.50 piece, striking it on a thinner planchet and using a distinctive design.

Although over 100,000 were struck in the first year, the coin saw little use. It circulated somewhat on the West Coast, where gold and silver were used to the exclusion of paper money, but what little place it had in commerce in the East was lost in the economic disruption of the Civil War, and was never regained. The piece was last struck in 1889, and Congress ended the series the following year. Although many dates were struck in small numbers, the rarest was produced at the San Francisco Mint in 1870 (1870-S); only one is known with certainty to exist which was sold by Heritage Auctions for $5,520,000 in 2023.

== Inception ==
In 1832, New York Congressman Campbell P. White sought a means of returning American gold coins to circulation—as gold was overvalued with respect to silver by the government, gold coins had been routinely exported since the start of the 19th century. White's solution was to have the silver dollar and gold eagle struck at full value, but to have smaller gold and silver coins, including a $3 piece, which contained less than their face value in metal. Although Congress, in passing the Coinage Act of 1834, made adjustments to the ratio between gold and silver, it did not authorize a $3 coin at that time.

The Act of March 3, 1845 authorized the first United States postage stamps and set the rate for local prepaid letters at five cents. In the years following, this rate was seen as too high and an impediment to commerce. Accordingly, Congress on March 3, 1851 authorized both a three-cent stamp and a three-cent silver coin. Kentucky Representative Richard Henry Stanton believed that the need to make change from a silver half dime with large copper cents might defeat the new scheme, writing to Mint Director Robert M. Patterson that "reduced postage [rates] depended on a three-cent coin for use in those states where copper does not circulate." According to numismatic historian Walter Breen, "the main purpose of the new 3¢ piece would be to buy postage stamps without using the unpopular, heavy, and often filthy copper cents.

By 1853, silver was overvalued with respect to gold. This was due to large discoveries of gold, especially in California, and silver was heavily exported. To correct this situation, Secretary of the Treasury Thomas Corwin advocated reducing the precious-metal content of most silver coins to prevent their export. The opposition to the bill was led by Tennessee Representative Andrew Johnson, who believed that Congress had no authority to alter the gold/silver price ratio and, if it did, it should not exercise it. Nevertheless, Congress passed the bill, which became law on February 21, 1853. That bill also authorized a three-dollar gold coin; according to numismatic writer Don Taxay, provision for it had been inserted at the behest of gold interests.

According to Breen, Congress believed the new coin "would be convenient for exchange for rolls or small bags of silver 3¢ pieces, and for buying sheets of 3¢ stamps—always bypassing use of copper cents". In 1889, then-Mint Director James P. Kimball wrote that "it is supposed that the three-dollar piece was designed to be a multiple of the three-cent piece, for the convenience of postal transactions". Numismatist Walter Hagans in his 2003 article on the three-dollar coin notes and dismisses the postal explanation, writing "the actual reason for the gold $3 coin was the abundant supply of gold discovered in California." Coin dealer and author Q. David Bowers notes that "whether or not the $3 denomination was actually necessary or worthwhile has been a matter of debate among numismatists for well over a century."

== Preparation and design ==
Much of what is known of the design process for the three-dollar piece is from an August 21, 1858, letter from the Mint's chief engraver, James B. Longacre, the coin's designer, to the then-Mint director, James Ross Snowden. This letter is apparently in response to some criticism, and in it, Longacre discussed his views on coin design, especially regarding the three-dollar piece. He noted that he was initially perplexed as to what to put on the coin; the three-dollar piece was the first time he had been allowed to choose a design. Although he had designed the three-cent piece and other issues before Snowden's directorship, he had been told what to put on those pieces. The coin weighed 64.5 grams, and had a fineness of 900.

Longacre noted that although those in charge of coinage design had usually dictated adaptations of Roman or Greek art, for the three-dollar coin, he was minded to create something truly American:

Why should we in seeking a type for the illustration or symbol of a nation that need not hold itself lower than the Roman virtue or the Science of Greece prefer the barbaric period of a remote and distant people, from which to draw an emblem of nationality: to the aboriginal period of our own land: especially when the latter presents us with a characteristic distinction not less interesting, and more peculiar than that which still casts its chain over the civilized portion of the older continent? Why not be American from the spring-head within our own domain? ... From the copper shores of Lake Superior to the silver mountains of Potosi, from the Ojibwa to the Araucanian, the feathered tiara is a characteristic of the primitiveness of our hemisphere as the turban is of the Asiatic.

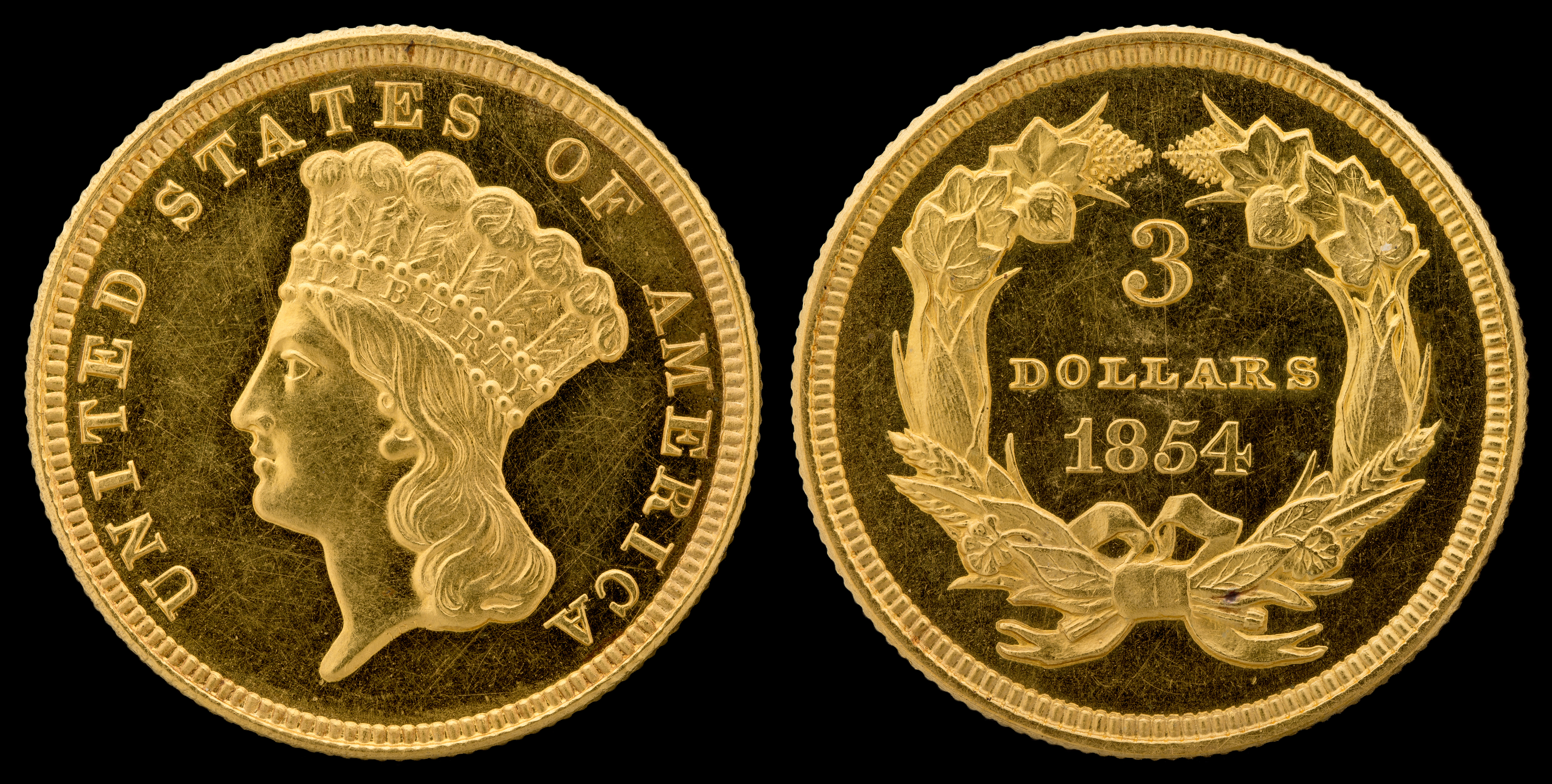
Longacre's initials JBL on the cutoff of the bust on the obverse

Representations of America as a female Native American, or Indian princess, dated back to the 16th century; cartographers would place a native woman, often wearing a feathered headdress, upon their version of the North American continent. This evolved into an image of an Indian queen, then an Indian princess, and although Columbia eventually came to be the favored female embodiment of the United States, the image of the Indian princess survives in the popular view of such figures as Pocahontas and Sacagawea.

Some sources suggest that Longacre may have based the features of Liberty on those of his daughter, Sarah. This story would be more often associated with Longacre's Indian Head cent, but the features of Liberty on both coins (and also the Type I gold dollar, the double eagle, and the three-cent nickel piece) are nearly identical. To help distinguish the new coin from the quarter eagle or $2.50 piece, Longacre used a thinner planchet, or blank, to make the piece greater in diameter. He also flattened the planchet of the gold dollar to enlarge it, and gave it the same Indian princess design. The reverse originates Longacre's "agricultural wreath" of corn, tobacco, cotton, and wheat which would also appear on the gold dollar, Flying Eagle cent, and his revised reverse for the Seated Liberty dime and half dime. This blended the produce of the South and North at a time of intersectional tension. Numismatist Walter Hagans deems the wreathed reverse "as uniquely American as is the Indian maiden on the obverse."

Art historian Cornelius Vermeule stated that "the one area in which Longacre gave free rein to his imagination was in the matter of fancy headdress for his renderings of Liberty. His caps of feathers, his bonnets of freedom, and his starry diadems are a joy to behold." Nevertheless, Vermeule disliked the figure on the obverse, "the princess of the gold coins is a banknote engraver's (Note: As was Longacre, before he became chief engraver) elegant version of folk art of the 1850s. The plumes or feathers are more like the crest of the Prince of Wales than anything that saw the Western frontier, save perhaps on a music hall beauty."

At the time of the authorization of the three-dollar piece, the Whig administration of Millard Fillmore was still in office, but two weeks later, Fillmore was succeeded by Democrat Franklin Pierce, and Mint Director George N. Eckert yielded his place to Thomas M. Pettit. Longacre submitted two designs to Pettit, and before the latter died on May 31, 1853, he selected one of the two; relief models quickly followed the approval. Longacre's models, both for the obverse and reverse, did not have lettering on them, as the legends and numbers were to be punched once a reduction was made. This allowed them to be used multiple times for different denominations. As Longacre was busy with the reduced-weight silver coins ordered by Congress in the same act that had authorized the three-dollar piece, work on dies did not begin until 1854.

== Production ==
The first three-dollar pieces were 15 proof coins, delivered to the Secretary of the Treasury, James Guthrie, by Mint Director Snowden on April 28, 1854, most likely for distribution to legislators. The Philadelphia Mint then began the largest production of three-dollar pieces the denomination would ever see. Chief Coiner Franklin Peale delivered 23,140 pieces on May 8 and 29,181 pieces four days later. However, after June 8, there was only one further delivery by Peale, on November 10, when the last 22,740 of the mintage of 138,618 were delivered. In addition to the strikings at Philadelphia, there was branch mint production, with 24,000 pieces struck at the New Orleans Mint (1854-O) and 1,120 at Dahlonega (1854-D). A pair of dies was sent from Philadelphia to the Charlotte Mint on June 1, but they were not used. A pair was sent to Dahlonega the same day, arriving on June 10, with gauges and other necessary equipment following on July 15. The coinage of the 1854-D took place in August; the piece is today a rarity as few were put aside and it was not until decades later that mintmarked coins were saved as distinct varieties. Dies were sent to New Orleans in 1855, 1856, 1859, and 1861, only to remain unused; no further strikings took place at any of the three southern branch mints.

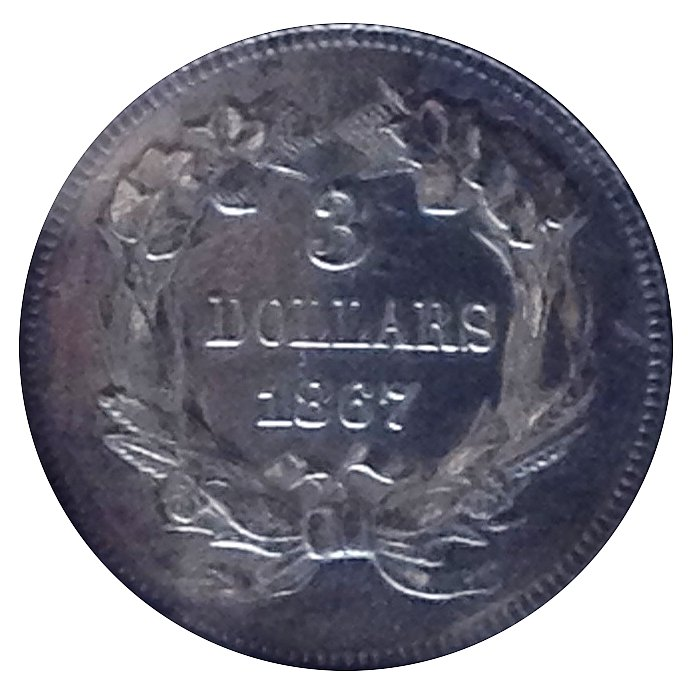
Off-metal strike in silver of the 1867 three-dollar piece

Beginning in 1855, the letters of the word "Dollars" were enlarged, following complaints from the public. The same year, coinage began at the San Francisco Mint, where 6,600 were struck as opposed to 50,555 at Philadelphia. Mintages at Philadelphia declined for the remainder of the decade, to 7,036 by 1860; pieces were also struck at San Francisco in 1856, 1857, and 1860. In 1859, early numismatic writer Montroville W. Dickeson wrote of the three-dollar piece, "it is very unpopular, being frequently mistaken for a quarter eagle, and often counted as a five-dollar piece. It is exceedingly annoying to that portion of the human family whose vision is dependent on artificial aid, and we think its retirement would meet with public approbation." Perhaps a dozen contemporary numismatists collected three-dollar pieces; those who were serious ordered proof coins from the Mint. Coins in this condition became easier to obtain from Philadelphia as officials responded to the rise in interest in coin collecting which followed the introduction of the Flying Eagle cent in 1857.

The coins saw some circulation in the East and Midwest, at least until 1861, when the economic turmoil caused by the American Civil War caused gold and silver to vanish from commerce there. With gold being hoarded, in December 1861, banks, and subsequently the Treasury, ceased to pay out gold at face value. The three-dollar piece would never return to circulation in the eastern part of the country. On the West Coast, where gold and silver remained in use, the coin continued in commerce, and might be occasionally encountered. The San Francisco Mint issues were most commonly seen there. Despite the failure to circulate, three-dollar pieces continued to be struck at Philadelphia as it was the policy of Mint Director James Pollock that each denomination should be struck every year, whether it circulated or not. Some Philadelphia Mint pieces migrated west in payment for transactions, as only gold and silver was acceptable money on the West Coast. Until the resumption of specie payments at the end of 1878, gold pieces were only available from the Philadelphia Mint by paying a premium in banknotes. Pieces not sold were stored there.

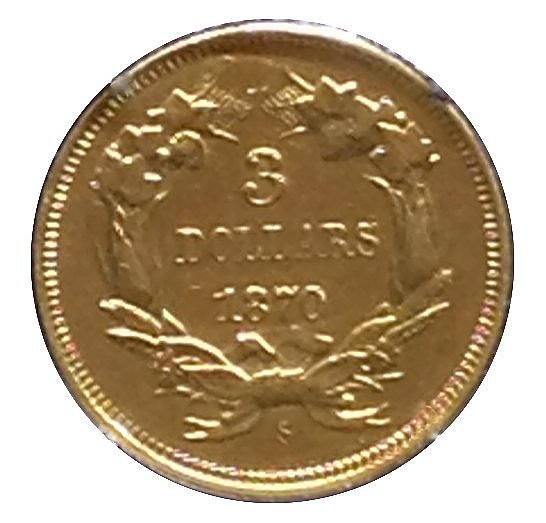
The 1870-S three-dollar piece

In 1870, a set of dies for the three-dollar piece was sent from the Bureau of the Mint's Engraving Department at the Philadelphia Mint to San Francisco. On May 14, 1870, Oscar Hugh La Grange, superintendent of the San Francisco Mint, sent a telegram to Mint Director Pollock, informing him that dies for the one- and three-dollar pieces had been received, but lacked the customary "S" mint mark, and asking for guidance. The dies were, per Pollock's instructions, returned to Philadelphia, but LaGrange informed Pollock that to secure a three-dollar piece to place in the cornerstone of the new San Francisco Mint building, (Note: Which still stands) Coiner J.B. Harmistead had engraved an "S" on the reverse die. It is not certain what became of the piece to be placed in the cornerstone, but Harmistead also struck a piece for himself, which was mounted as jewelry at one time, and the existence of which was not known until 1907. The only unique regular-issue U.S. gold piece by date and mint mark, (Note: The 1849 double eagle is considered a pattern coin.) it had previously been sold for $687,500 in 1982. It didn't change hands again until 2023, where it sold for $5,520,000. Previously part of the Harry W. Bass, Jr. Collection in the Money Museum of the American Numismatic Association in Colorado Springs, it now resides in a private collection. No other three-dollar pieces were struck at San Francisco in 1870; dies were sent there most years between 1861 and 1873, but, with the exception of 1870, were not used.

On January 18, 1873, Philadelphia Mint Chief Coiner Archibald Loudon Snowden complained that the "3" in the date, as struck by the Mint, too closely resembled an "8", especially on the smaller-sized denominations. In response, Pollock ordered Chief Engraver William Barber to re-engrave the date, opening the arms of the "3" wider on most denominations, including the three-dollar piece. Both varieties of the date are extremely rare. The open 3 is a proof-only issue with no recorded mintage figure, while the closed 3 has an official mintage of 25 pieces. However, it is believed that this is understated, since more than 25 specimens have been accounted for. In 1875 and 1876, no pieces were struck for circulation, with only pieces in proof being made available to collectors. The official mintage is 20 for 1875 and 45 for 1876, though an unknown number of pieces may have been later illicitly restruck for each date. Numismatic writer R.W. Julian believes that there were no later restrikes, but as proof pieces were not counted until sold, employees substituted common-date pieces when unsold coins were to be melted. These pieces had been made available to the public only as part of a proof set of all gold denominations, at a price of $43 (a premium of $1.50 over face value). Julian suggests that the relatively large mintages of almost 42,000 in 1874 and some 82,000 in 1878 were struck in anticipation of the resumption of specie payments, but when this finally occurred at the end of 1878, "there was a loud yawn from the public and the Mint kept most of the pieces on hand, paying them out slowly as stocking stuffers.

== Final years and termination ==
In the 1880s, despite the return of gold to commerce nationwide with the resumption of specie payments at the end of 1878, few three-dollar pieces were coined. There was a small speculative boom by the public in putting aside three-dollar pieces; nevertheless, thousands remained at the Philadelphia Mint. Few were sent to banks; the coins sold for a small premium when banks had some or when they were purchased from exchange brokers. The coins' main use was as gifts, or in jewelry. The pieces were struck only at Philadelphia after the 1870-S rarity, and early numismatist S.H. Chapman noted of the 1879 through 1889 issues, "of the later years of the $3, large numbers were remelted at the Philadelphia Mint." The Mint apparently favored certain Philadelphia dealers in the distribution of the gold dollar, but the three-dollar piece could be obtained without a premium at the cashier's window of the Philadelphia Mint. Large numbers of the 1879 three-dollar piece (mintage 3,000 for circulation), 1880 (1,000), and 1881 (500) were hoarded by early coin collector and dealer Thomas L. Elder, who asked bank tellers to look out for them. Elder could not have obtained them directly from the Mint at the time of issue as he was still a child in 1880, and did not begin collecting coins until 1887.

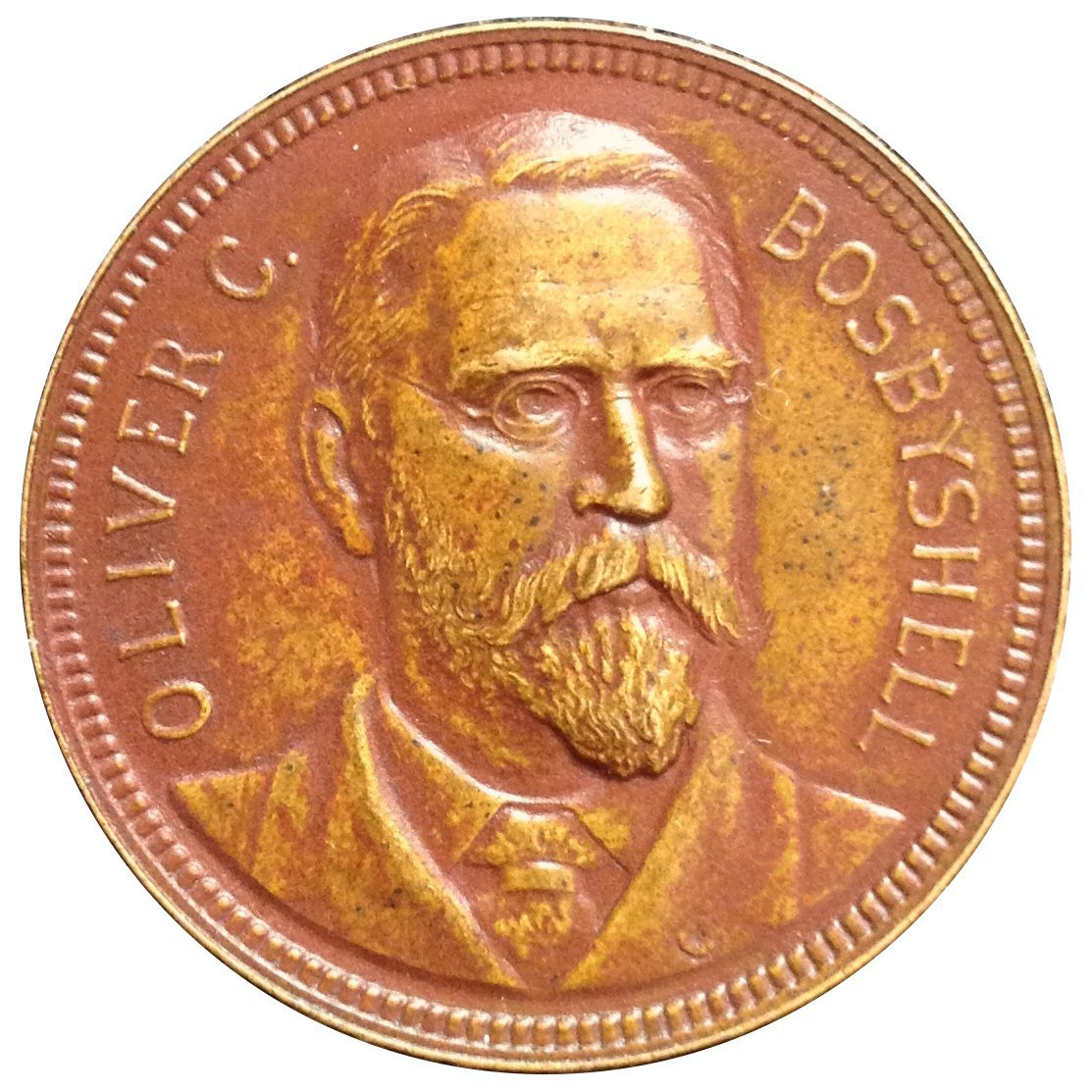
Philadelphia Mint Chief Coiner Oliver Bosbyshell was responsible for many unofficial pieces leaving the facility. Seen on his Mint medal by George T. Morgan.

With the rise of collecting interest in the three-dollar piece in the 1880s, unscrupulous employees at the Philadelphia Mint enriched themselves by illicit striking of earlier-date pieces, including the 1873, 1875, and 1876. Bowers, in his sylloge of the Bass Collection, particularly blames these irregularities on Oliver Bosbyshell, chief coiner at Philadelphia from 1876 to 1885. During that period, quantities of pattern coins, restrikes, and pieces struck in different metals flowed to well-connected collectors and dealers, and Bosbyshell sold a large personal collection of such pieces shortly after leaving office as chief coiner. Although Bosbyshell returned as Philadelphia Mint superintendent from 1889 to 1894, he did not appear to have resumed his illicit activities.

The relatively large mintage of about 6,000 in 1887 was due to a fad sweeping the country, whereby men would present their lady friends with a coin with one side ground off and replaced by the woman's initials. Many wealthy suitors preferred to use a gold coin for this presentation. A larger-than-usual number of proof pieces were struck in 1888 and held by the Mint in anticipation of future trades with collectors for items which the Mint desired for its coin collection. The 1888 piece is the most common proof coin in the series, with an official mintage of 200 pieces.

In 1889, Mint Director James P. Kimball sent a letter to the House of Representatives Committee on Coinage, Weights, and Measures urging the abolition of the three-dollar piece. Kimball wrote, "this is a denomination which serves no useful purpose, its present coinage being in fact limited to its production for cabinet [coin collecting] purposes. The value of over $153,000 in three-dollar pieces still on hand at the Mint at Philadelphia can not be disposed of, owing to the unpopularity of this coin as a circulating medium." The gold dollar and three-dollar piece were not coined after 1889, and were abolished by Congress on September 26, 1890.

In the 1890s, 49,087 three-dollar pieces were melted as obsolete at the Philadelphia Mint. Although no list was kept by years, Bowers suggests that many of the pieces were dated 1874 or 1878 (both years with relatively high mintages), or were from the final years of the series. In the 1890s, they typically commanded a premium of 25 or 50 cents at exchange brokers. In the 1920s, three-dollar pieces sold at a premium when other denominations of gold coinage remained at face value. The 2014 edition of R.S. Yeoman's A Guide Book of United States Coins lists the 1854 as the cheapest three-dollar piece in the lowest listed condition (Very Fine or VF-20) at $825. An 1855-S in proof was the former record holder in sales price for the denomination, selling at auction in 2011 for $1,322,500. This title has since been taken by the 1870-S specimen, which sold in 2023 for $5,520,000.

In 1934, Mint Director Nellie Tayloe Ross wrote in her annual report that a total of 539,792 three-dollar pieces had been coined, of which 452,572 were struck at Philadelphia, 62,350 at San Francisco (not including the 1870-S), 24,000 at New Orleans, and 1,120 at Dahlonega. According to Breen, three-dollar pieces "represent relics of an interesting but abortive experiment; today they are among the most highly coveted of American gold coins". New York coin dealer Norman Stack stated in the 1950s, "All are rare. There is no such thing as a common three-dollar gold piece."

== Notes and references ==
=== Bibliography ===
- Bowers, Q. David (2001). The Harry W. Bass, Jr. Museum Sylloge. Dallas, Tex.: Harry W. Bass, Jr. Foundation. ISBN 0-943161-88-6.
- Bowers, Q. David; Winter, Douglas A.; Jewell, Richard (2005). The United States $3 Gold Pieces 1854–1889. Wolfeboro, N.H.: American Numismatic Rarities, LLC. ISBN 0-9765313-0-5.
- Breen, Walter (1988). Walter Breen's Complete Encyclopedia of U.S. and Colonial Coins. New York, N.Y.: Doubleday. ISBN 978-0-385-14207-6. OL 4404444M.
- DeLorey, Tom (October 1985). "Longacre: Unsung engraver of the U.S. Mint". The Numismatist. Colorado Springs, Co.: American Numismatic Association: 1970–1978.
- Garrett, Jeff; Guth, Ron (2008). Encyclopedia of U.S. Gold Coins, 1795–1933 (second ed.). Atlanta, Ga.: Whitman Publishing, LLC. ISBN 978-0-7948-2254-5.
- Hagans, Walter E. (April 2003). "Native beauty: Lady Liberty's colonial roots personified on gold $3". Coins. Iola, Wis.: Krause Publications: 54–56, 58, 60.
- Hahn, Karl (May 1962). "The three-cent silver piece of 1851". Numismatic Scrapbook Magazine. Chicago: Hewitt Bros.: 1296.
- Julian, R.W. (November 1998). "America's $3 coin". Coins. Iola, Wis.: Krause Publications: 34–36.
- Snow, Richard (2009). A Guide Book of Flying Eagle and Indian Head Cents. Atlanta, Ga.: Whitman Publishing, LLC. ISBN 978-0-7948-2831-8.
- Taxay, Don (1983). The U.S. Mint and Coinage (reprint of 1966 ed.). New York, N.Y.: Sanford J. Durst Numismatic Publications. ISBN 978-0-915262-68-7.
- Vermeule, Cornelius (1971). Numismatic Art in America. Cambridge, Mass.: The Belknap Press of Harvard University Press. ISBN 978-0-674-62840-3.
- Yeoman, R.S. (2013). A Guide Book of United States Coins 2014 (67th ed.). Atlanta, Ga.: Whitman Publishing, LLC. ISBN 978-0-7948-4180-5.
