= Coinage (Measurement) Act 2011 =

Act of the Parliament of the United Kingdom

Coinage (Measurement) Act 2011 (Note: Section 2(3).)
- Act of Parliament
- Parliament of the United Kingdom
- Long title: An Act to make provision about the arrangements for measuring the standard weight of coins.
- Citation: 2011 c.17
- Introduced by: Mark Lancaster (Commons); Baron Risby (Lords)
- Territorial extent: England and Wales; Scotland; Northern Ireland; (Note: Section 2(1).)

Dates
- Royal assent: 3 November 2011
- Commencement: 3 January 2012 (Note: Section 2(2).)
Other legislation
Amends	Coinage Act 1971

Status: Current legislation

History of passage through Parliament

Text of statute as originally enacted

Revised text of statute as amended

The Coinage (Measurement) Act 2011 (c. 17) is an act of the Parliament of the United Kingdom.

== Background ==
Before the act, manufacturing coins outside weights specified in regulations was illegal.

== Provisions ==
It amends s.1 and s.3 of the Coinage Act 1971 to allow the method for measuring and confirming the weight of coins to be set by proclamation, rather than the fixed statutory method of using a test sample of less than 1 kg in weight. This was necessary in order for the Royal Mint to strike 1 kg gold and silver coins to commemorate the 2012 Summer Olympics in London.

The bill was presented to parliament on 30 June 2010, and received royal assent into law on 3 November 2011.

== Reception ==
The legislation was supported by Lord Davies of Oldham.
