= Coinage Act of 1857 =

United States act banning the use of foreign currency

The Coinage Act of 1857 (Act of Feb. 21, 1857, Chap. 56, 34th Cong., Sess. III, 11 Stat. 163) was an act of the United States Congress which ended the status of foreign coins as legal tender, repealing all acts "authorizing the currency of foreign gold or silver coins". Specific coins would be exchanged at the Treasury and re-coined. The act is divided into seven sections.

== Background ==
Before the Act, foreign coins, such as the Spanish dollar, were widely used and allowed as legal tender by the Act of April 10, 1806. The Coinage Act of 1857 also discontinued the half cent. Furthermore, the penny was reduced in size. The large cent was discontinued and regular coinage of the Flying Eagle cent began.

== History ==
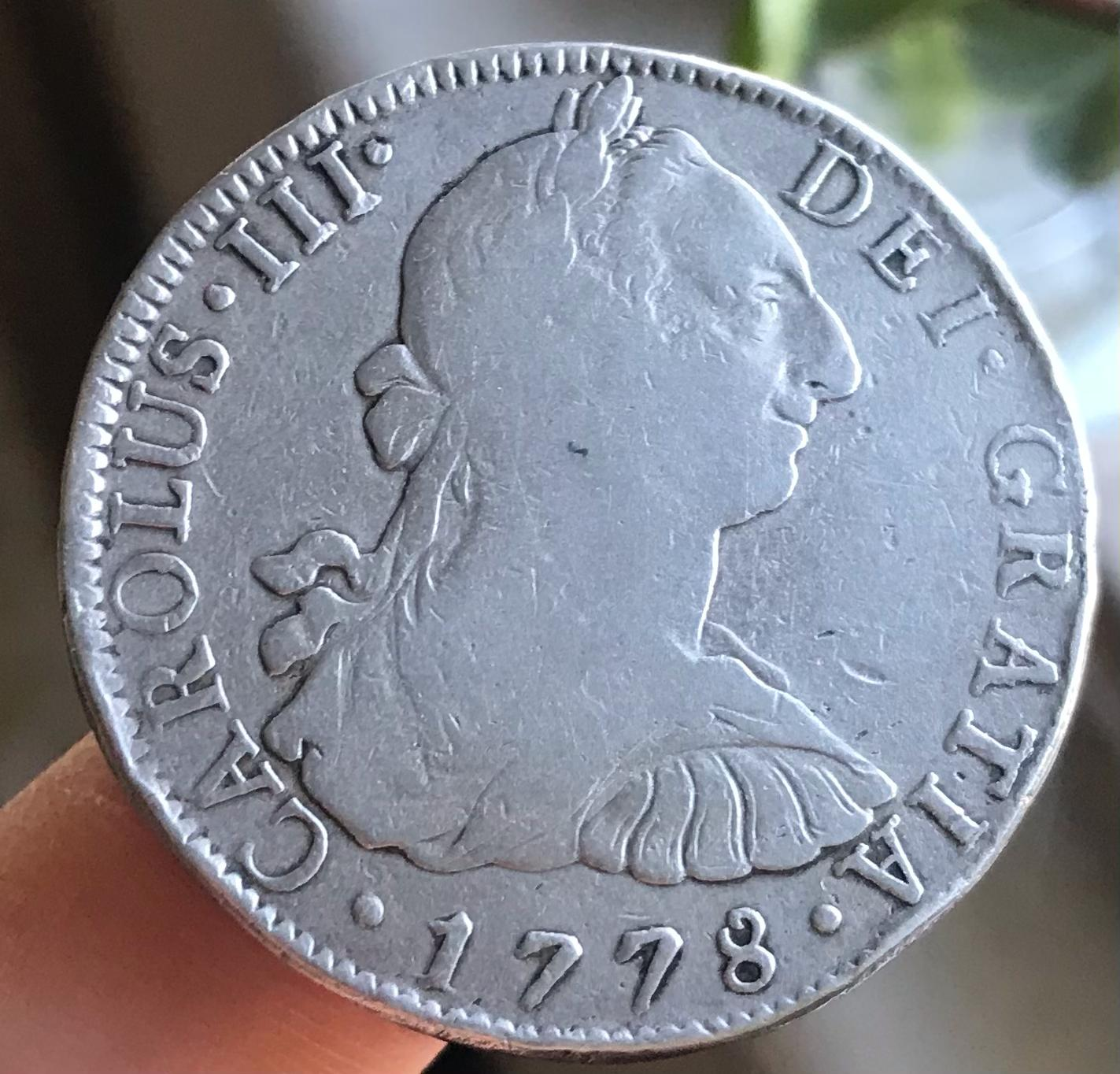
Prior to the act, coins such as this 1778 silver 8 reales from the Spanish Empire could be used in transactions.

In the newly created union after the Revolutionary War and up until 1792 and the establishment of the United States Mint, the sole medium of exchange in terms of specie was foreign coin. Alexander Hamilton had proposed that foreign coin (of which he specially based the dollar) circulate freely for a period of three years until the new mint in Philadelphia was running at full capacity in order to have a smooth transition. This clause was renewed several times after being first specifically spelled out on April 10, 1806. By 1830, about 25% of all circulating coins were milled of Spanish origin. President Andrew Jackson supported foreign coin as legal tender in his famous war with the Bank of the US in the Gold Bill. This new development ended up making it difficult for the US to retain its overvalued worn Spanish silver in the 1840s. By the late 1840s and early 1850s, the US mint had finally been able to match demand for foreign coin.

== Effects ==
The Coinage Act of 1857 repealed prior legal tender laws concerning foreign specie. It fixed the weight and measure of US one-cent pieces at 4.655 grams, which was composed of 88% copper and 12% nickel. It also mandated that this new copper/nickel alloy be received as payment for the worn gold and silver coins turned in at the mint. The effective aim was to limit the domestic money supply by crushing European competition. This was the first major step towards the government essentially having a monopoly over the money supply.

The act drastically altered American business. For decades, those who had accepted any form of payment as long as it was made of specie began to immediately only tolerate those newly minted with a fresh seal from the US government. Due to insatiable demand early on for the new federal cents and the profits to be made by collecting the foreign silver, many individuals, along with banks, competed with each other. The newly minted American silver made much of the foreign silver obsolete in the eyes of some. There also was the ever-present issue of the non-decimal system used in foreign coin, making prices subject to fractions of a cent and therefore payments were inconvenient. Even still, circulation of foreign coins lasted for decades longer in the rural interior.

== See also ==
- Coinage Act of 1792
- Coinage Act of 1834
- Coinage Act of 1849
- Coinage Act of 1853
- Coinage Act of 1864
- Coinage Act of 1873
- Coinage Act of 1965
