= Coinage Act of 1965 =

Federal law of the United States

- Long title: An Act to provide for the coinage of the United States
- Enacted by: the 89th United States Congress

Citations
- Public law: 89–81
- Statutes at Large: 79 Stat. 254

Legislative history
- Introduced in the Senate as S. 2080 by A. Willis Robertson (D–VA) on June 3, 1965; Committee consideration by Senate Committee on Banking and Currency; Passed the Senate on June 24, 1965 (74–9); Passed the House on July 14, 1965 (255–151) with amendment; Senate agreed to House amendment on July 15, 1965 (passed); Signed into law by President Lyndon B. Johnson on July 23, 1965

The Coinage Act of 1965, Pub. L. 89–81, 79 Stat. 254, enacted July 23, 1965, eliminated silver from the circulating United States dime (ten-cent piece) and quarter dollar coins. It also reduced the silver content of the half dollar from 90% to 40%; silver in the half dollar was subsequently eliminated by a 1970 law.

There had been coin shortages beginning in 1959, and the United States Bureau of the Mint expanded production to try to meet demand. The early 1960s was a time of increased use of silver both in the coinage and in industry, putting pressure on the price of silver, which was capped at just over $1.29 per ounce by government sales at that price. The silver in a dollar's worth of quarters would be worth more as bullion than as money if the price of the metal rose past $1.38 per ounce, and there was widespread hoarding of silver coins. Demand for the Kennedy half dollar as a collectable drove it from circulation after its debut in 1964. The Bureau of the Mint increased production, helping reduce the coin shortages by May 1965, but government stocks of silver were being rapidly reduced, and threatened to run out by 1968. After extensive study by the Treasury Department, President Lyndon B. Johnson in June 1965 recommended that Congress pass legislation to allow for silverless dimes and quarters, and debased silver half dollars. Although there was some opposition, mainly from legislators representing Western mining states, the bill progressed rapidly through Congress, and was enacted with Johnson's signature on July 23, 1965.

The new coins began to enter circulation in late 1965, and alleviated the shortages. They passed side by side with their silver counterparts for a time, but the precious metal coins were hoarded beginning in 1967 as the Treasury ended its efforts to keep silver prices low. The act also banned the production of silver dollars until at least 1970.

== Background ==
The Coinage Act of 1792 established the Mint of the United States, and made both gold and silver legal tender. This meant that anyone could present bullion at the Philadelphia Mint and receive it back, struck into coins. The 1792 act authorized six silver coins, in value from five cents to a dollar, and prescribed their weights and fineness. Making a dollar equal to given quantities of both gold and silver made the currency vulnerable to variations in the price of precious metals, and U.S. coins flowed overseas for melting until adjustments were made to their size and weight in 1834 and again with the Coinage Act of 1853, when the amount of bullion in the silver coins worth less than a dollar was reduced. The fact that the dime (ten-cent piece), quarter dollar, and other smaller silver coins contained less silver in proportion to the dollar helped keep them in circulation.

With the Coinage Act of 1873, the dollar was no longer equivalent to a set amount of silver. This statutory change was made so that as the price of silver dropped with increased U.S. production, mining companies could not present their bullion at the mints and receive it back struck into silver dollars worth more as money than they were as metal. By the post-World War II era, the Bureau of the Mint was striking the three remaining precious metal coins, the dime, quarter and half dollar in 90 percent silver—the dollar had not been coined since 1935 and circulated little outside some Western states like Nevada and Montana. The metal in a silver dollar was worth more as bullion than as money above $1.2929 per troy ounce; the smaller coins would be attractive for the melting pot above $1.38 per ounce.

Beginning in 1934, the price of silver in the United States was effectively set by the government as it would support that price through purchases and sales of the metal; in 1934 it was $0.45 per troy ounce. In 1958, with the return of lend-lease bullion, the Treasury's stock of silver reached 2.1 billion troy ounces; it began to offer the metal at $0.91 per ounce to the public, despite the warnings of the Conference of Western Governors that there was not enough silver to make these sales and maintain coinage operations.

Worldwide consumption of silver more than doubled between 1958 and 1965, but production increased by only about 15 percent. Industrial uses for silver included photographic film, batteries, and electronic components. At the same time, the Mint's production of silver coin increased as it attempted to meet demand; it used 111.5 million troy ounces of silver in coinage in 1963, up from just over 38 million in 1958. In spite of the increased demand, silver prices were checked by the fact that the Treasury would redeem silver certificates: paper money exchangeable for silver dollars (or the bullion equivalent, 0.7734 troy ounces), thus placing a ceiling of $1.29 per ounce on the market. Without government as the supplier of last resort, silver would rise in price, likely making it profitable to melt not only silver dollars, but the subsidiary silver coins as well. In 1963, the gap between production and consumption by the non-communist world amounted to 209 million ounces. Just lower than world production (210 million ounces), this gap was filled by the sale of Treasury silver at $1.29 per ounce. Even a rise in the price of silver likely would not have led to a major jump in production, as silver was for the most part obtained as a by-product in the mining of other metals, such as copper and lead.

The Bureau of the Mint in 1955 ended coinage operations at the San Francisco Mint, deeming it cheaper to supply the West Coast with coins from Denver. The Denver Mint (opened in 1906) had been modernized twice, in contrast to the aging Philadelphia Mint, constructed in 1901 and with much of its coinage equipment dating from then. Plans for a replacement facility had been scuttled multiple times by political infighting, as a new mint was sought not only by different cities, but by various neighborhoods of the city of Philadelphia.

== Coin shortage ==
In the postwar era, occasional coin shortages had been known, often local and seasonal, and generally brief in duration. The shortage might affect one of the five denominations (cent, nickel, dime, quarter and half dollar) being minted for circulation. The Federal Reserve Banks ("the Fed"), responsible for obtaining coins from the Mint and distributing them on request to member banks, also performed the function of receiving from these banks coins they did not need, a process known as "flowback". Coins were returned from commercial banks to the Fed, were processed and cleaned, and were then sent to banks needing them. These recycled pieces represented the bulk of what the Fed shipped, and perhaps only a fifth were new coins.

The banks accustomed themselves to seasonal need for coins, as for quarters and half dollars in Michigan to pay cherry pickers the traditional 75-cent rate, and to local preferences; for example, half dollars were not popular in New York, two quarters being preferred instead. Beginning in late 1959, the Mint failed to provide enough coins to satisfy demand, and the Fed, through its district banks and branches, imposed rationing. By 1963, there was often rationing of all denominations, commercial banks (and their retail customers) receiving less than they needed. There were widespread shortages of some denominations during the 1962 holiday shopping season. Traditionally, the heavy demand for coinage late in the year resulted in a large amount of flowback in the winter, but in early 1963, few coins returned to the banks, or to the Fed. Officials suggested responsibility might lie with coin collectors and investors, as well as uncollected coins remaining in the nation's millions of vending machines. The Mint increased production to around-the-clock shifts at Philadelphia and Denver. A new Philadelphia Mint was authorized in 1963, though the hoped-for opening date of 1966 was soon pushed back to 1967 (it eventually opened in 1969).

The coin shortage did not ease during 1963. In spite of heavy production by the two mints, early 1964 saw but a trickle of flowback, alarming the Fed. Investigation showed that banks and their business customers were retaining coins, fearing shortages. Many of the silver ones were being taken out of circulation by people believing the price of that metal would rise.

The Treasury began removing silver certificates from circulation, replacing them with Federal Reserve Notes. This helped free up silver that did not have to be held as backing for the certificates, which the Treasury redeemed with silver bullion instead of dollar coins after March 1964, when it stopped paying out silver dollars. It had almost depleted a stock that had been at just under 273 million in 1954. There had been a run on the Treasury for them; citizens could obtain up to 50,000 in a day, and payment in silver certificates was not required. In much-photographed scenes at the Treasury Building in Washington, citizens had shown up with wheelbarrows, armed guards, and even armored cars to haul away the silver. The remaining silver dollars held in the Treasury (2,970,928 as of May 20, 1965) had high numismatic value; Congress in 1970 authorized their sale at a premium to collectors.

President Kennedy's assassination in November 1963 led to calls to honor him with a place on one of the circulating coins, and the Kennedy half dollar was authorized by Congress on December 30. When 26 million of the new coins were issued on March 24, 1964, they were immediately hoarded, both by investors and by those wanting a memento of Kennedy, and the situation did not ease as more coins were produced. One-third of the record-breaking 202.5 million ounces of silver used in coinage in 1964 thus became coins that did not circulate. Congress allowed the Mint to continue to strike 1964-dated pieces into 1965, hoping to make them not worth putting aside.

Congress in August 1964 passed an appropriation intended to be used for striking 45 million silver dollars. The Senate Majority Leader, Mike Mansfield, was from hard-money Montana and insisted on the Mint proceeding. The Mint struck over 300,000 of them, bearing the Peace dollar design and the date 1964, in May 1965 but due to a public outcry that the coins would only be hoarded, they were melted. The minting had been at the direction of President Lyndon Johnson; the subsequent flip-flop on the question left Nevada Senator Alan Bible, a prominent supporter of the mining industry, unimpressed with the administration's leadership on coin matters, feeling officials were leaving the mess for Congress to straighten out. He introduced legislation to outlaw hoarding, export, and melting of U.S. coins, but the bill went nowhere.

In the interim, the coin shortage continued, putting supermarkets, drugstores, and other large retail establishments under great pressure. Two chains in the Midwest commissioned their own paper scrip, but this was never issued as the Treasury warned it trespassed on the federal prerogative to coin money. Stores urged customers to break open piggy banks and bring in the contents. Coins obtained by newsboys, vending-machine operators, and churches on collection plates were ardently sought after by stores and banks. They had competition in this regard, as investors also wanted the coins, and withdrew them from circulation.

In addition to the circulated coinage, investors wanted the new 1964 pieces (especially the half dollar) and a lively market in rolls and large canvas bags of coins developed in the pages of Coin World, with the advertisements examined at congressional hearings. Some banks were offered ample quantities of coin at a premium, or the exchange of bags of old coinage for the new; most refused, and bank employees who cooperated with would-be accumulators were fired. Numismatic writer David Lange pointed out that the collecting of recent coins in rolls peaked in 1964, and believed the coin collecting hobby's blame for the shortage unfair.

The Mint arranged to outsource part of the coin-making process, and pledged to flood the nation with coins by 1965. Despite an increased need for coins in an improving economy, merchants made it past the 1964 holiday season without severe shortages, though the half dollar had stopped circulating. Most Fed facilities reported sufficient supplies of cents and nickels, with some still short on dimes and quarters, and shortages of half dollars everywhere—one Fed official wrote that his branch had not seen a half dollar deposited by a bank in eight months.

The Treasury conducted extensive research, and in May 1965 concluded that the nation could not go on using so much silver in its coinage. It decided on clad coinage, with copper-nickel faces and a pure copper core, as the most desirable replacement material. Such a composition would work in place of silver in vending machines, which would not require wholesale adjustment. Copper and nickel were readily available, and the melt value of the new coins would be much under face value. The material was hard, allowing the designs to remain recognizable for long periods, and other nations, such as the United Kingdom, had transitioned from silver to copper-nickel coins. The Mint conducted lengthy test runs, and did not experience production problems.

== Legislation ==
On June 3, 1965, President Johnson sent a special message to Congress, asking it to pass legislation allowing the dime and quarter to be made from base metal, and to reduce the silver content of the half dollar to 40 percent. The silver dollar would be unaffected if any were struck, but there were no plans to do so. He noted that the metal for the silver coinage was being struck from dwindling Treasury stocks, rather than from newly mined silver, and that the government bullion would be entirely used up by 1968. Johnson argued that the metal necessary for industry must not be wasted as a means of exchange. He urged the passage of draft legislation, attached to the message, and said the bill would "ensure a stable and dignified coinage, fully adequate in quantity and in its specially designed technical characteristics to the needs of our Twentieth Century life. It can be maintained indefinitely, however much the demand for coin may grow."

Under Johnson's proposal, there would be no change in the cent or nickel, but the dime and quarter would be made with a clad composition, that is copper-nickel bonded to a core of pure copper; the half dollar would have 80 percent silver faces and the core would contain 21 percent silver. The clad alloy had similar electrical properties to silver, and so would work in existing vending machines. He also sent the Treasury Staff Report on which his recommendations were based. This report had been expected in February, but had been repeatedly delayed, in part because outgoing Treasury Secretary C. Douglas Dillon felt that his successor should approve the plan, as he would have to live with the consequences. The new secretary, Henry H. Fowler, had needed time to study the problem, further delaying the report's issuance. If adopted, the bill would reduce the need for silver in U.S. coinage by 90 percent.

Hearings on the president's proposal, introduced as H.R. 8926, began before the House Banking and Currency Committee on June 4. Chairman Wright Patman, the bill's sponsor, deemed it to have something for everyone, including price supports for silver, though industrial users would benefit most, as the silver formerly used in coinage would be freed up for commercial use. Most business stakeholders, including the banks, the vending machine operators, and corporate leaders, wanted to see the bill pass, it being better than the current situation. On June 11, the committee issued a report recommending the bill pass, with amendments requiring the half dollar to be made of base metal, requiring the silver coins that would be struck during the transition period to be dated 1964, and banning the striking of silver dollars for five years.

One day of hearings on S. 2080, the version introduced into the Senate, was held before that body's Committee on Banking and Currency on June 9, with Virginia Senator A. Willis Robertson, the chairman, presiding. Senator Bible and others from mining states sought to retain silver in the currency or include provisions from Bible's earlier bill banning hoarding of coins, but they were not successful. On June 11, the Senate committee issued a report recommending the bill's passage, with several amendments, mostly technical in nature. The bill required the Treasury to buy newly mined U.S. silver at $1.25 per ounce when presented by mining companies; a five-year limit was placed on this.

The Senate considered the bill between June 22 and 24, 1965. An amendment by Rhode Island Senator John Pastore to remove silver entirely from the half dollar failed, 32–60. A number of senators wished to retain silver in the dime and quarter, and called for them to be made from 40 percent silver, but an amendment to that effect was defeated. There were other failed amendments, including one by Bible to prohibit melting of silver coins by the public. Robertson was determined to prevent any changes to the bill, which had been unanimously approved by his committee, and each attempt failed. The bill passed the Senate, 74–9, the opponents being Bible and other Western senators.

The House of Representatives debated the bill on July 13 and 14, 1965. The discussion was wide-ranging. Idaho Congressman Compton I. White opposed the bill, having prepared a chart showing the debasement of the Roman denarius between the years 1 and 300, though stating that he did not expect that coinage debasement would cause a government to fall. Nevada's Walter S. Baring noted that the Treasury was selling silver to the makers of cutlery and stated, "I would rather eat with chopsticks than take the silver out of our coinage". Massachusetts' Silvio Conte denigrated Sir Thomas Gresham for illicit profits when the Royal Exchange in London was established, but conceded that Gresham's law would nevertheless cause base metal coins to drive the silver ones from circulation. Iowa's Harold Gross asked Conte that if the U.S. was going to debase its coinage, why not go back to wampum. Minor amendments, including removing the mint mark from coinage for up to five years, were agreed to. There was objection to the committee amendment removing silver entirely from the half dollar; it was defeated 48–94, leaving the half dollar at 40 percent silver. Congressman James F. Battin of Montana offered an amendment to make the dime and quarter out of 40 percent silver; although Patman objected that the committee had rejected the idea, it initially passed 122–112. However, this was at the Committee of the Whole stage, and Patman got the House to reject the Battin amendment, 197–218. After other attempts were made in vain to derail the bill, the House Minority Leader, Michigan's Gerald R. Ford, asked that there be a recorded vote on H.R. 8926, and the bill passed, 255–151, Ford voting in favor. Patman then had the House amend the Senate bill, S. 2080, to reflect the House-passed language, and pass it.

The House notified the Senate that it had passed S. 2080. The Senate, considering the bill on July 15, could either agree to the House amendments or go to a conference committee, and after disgruntlement at some of the House amendments—the House had greatly expanded the membership of the Joint Commission on the Coinage, which was to make recommendations on useful changes—the Senate passed the House's version without a recorded vote, though Washington's Warren Magnuson requested that the record show him as voting against the bill. President Johnson enacted S. 2080 as the Coinage Act of 1965 with his signature on July 23, 1965.

== Provisions ==
=== Title I—Authorization of additional coinage (sections 101 to 108) ===
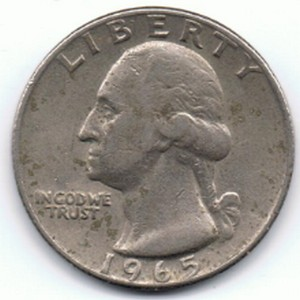
A clad 1965 quarter, worn by years of circulation

Section 101 authorized the Secretary of the Treasury to issue dimes, quarters, and half dollars of clad composition, with the half dollar to be made of 40 percent silver. So long as there was a shortage of coins, the Mint could strike dimes, quarters, and half dollars from .900 silver, but this authority was to end once the secretary certified there was an adequate supply of the new coins in circulation, and in any event five years after the law was enacted (thus, ending July 23, 1970). During that five-year period, no standard silver dollars could be minted.

Section 102 made all coins and currency of the United States legal tender without limit, reiterating language found in the Act of May 12, 1933. (Note: 31 U.S.C. 462) That part of the 1933 act was repealed in section 210 to avoid possible legal arguments that section 102 did other than restate existing law. Section 103 gave the secretary broad discretion to acquire equipment, supplies, and patent rights to expedite the production of coins during the emergency, with the provision again to expire after five years. Section 104 required the secretary to purchase at $1.25 per troy ounce silver bullion of U.S. origin within a year of the month in which it was mined. According to the Senate committee report on the bill, section 104 was intended "as a precautionary measure to protect our mining industry from any undue downward fluctuations in the market during the period of transition". This provision, which was limited to five years by the House committee, was deemed to be "continuing government interference in the market for silver" by the American Institute for Economic Research in its report on Johnson's message to Congress.

Section 105 authorized the secretary to prohibit the melting, export, or treating of any coin, if necessary to protect the nation's coinage, and prescribed a penalty of up to five years in prison for violation of such an order—section 106 declared that coins seized under section 105 would be forfeited to the United States, with the secretary given powers paralleling those under the Internal Revenue Code to enforce such forfeitures. Section 107 allowed the secretary to issue regulations to put into force the Coinage Act of 1965, while section 108 contained definitions and similar technical matters.

=== Title II—Amendments of existing law (sections 201 to 212) ===
Section 201 amended legislation regarding the San Francisco Assay Office to allow coins to be minted there (as they previously were when it was the San Francisco Mint) until such time as the secretary certified that the mints of the United States were able to strike sufficient coins to meet the needs of the nation. It also repealed a provision of law not allowing gold or silver to be refined at the San Francisco facility. Section 202 increased the amount appropriated to expand Mint facilities (including the construction of the new Philadelphia Mint) from $30 million to $45 million. Section 9 of the Gold Standard Act of 1900 had required the Treasury Secretary to melt silver coins that were worn or no longer current, and restrike them into new ones; this was repealed by section 203 and the secretary was given authority to withdraw and melt all worn or uncurrent coins without needing to reuse the metal in coinage.

Section 204 amended the Coinage Act of 1873, which required the year of striking to appear on coins. During the 1965 or subsequent coinage emergency, the secretary could continue to strike coins dated with a year that has passed, with the silver ones in the present crisis to be dated 1964, and the clad ones 1965 or after. The House Banking Committee added language to Johnson's proposal, eliminating mint marks on coins for up to five years, excepting the mint mark "D" for Denver on 1964-dated coins struck there.

A bullion fund was authorized under previous law within the Mint; section 205 allowed purchases of silver made under section 104 to be paid for from this fund. Another Mint account, the minor coinage metal fund, used to purchase copper and other metals for cents and nickels, was redesignated the coinage metal fund by section 206, usable for all denominations, and that section eliminated statutory limits on how much money can be in that fund.

Section 207 repealed obsolete limitations on wastage in the Mint's operations, but directed that administrative regulations be developed on the subject, which could be more easily changed. Section 208 repealed a provision of the 1873 act requiring coinage dies for the obverse, which are dated, to be destroyed at the end of each year. Section 209 rephrased statutory provisions allowing the Treasury to sell silver at a price not less than $1.292929 per ounce, and allowed it to sell silver to other government departments for less. Section 210 repealed the 1933 provision regarding the legal tender status of coins. The law prior to 1965 made it a felony to forge silver coins; this was amended by section 211 to forbid the counterfeiting of coins with denomination greater than five cents. Section 212 made using coins as security for loans a misdemeanor if the secretary has made a proclamation in the Federal Register proscribing their use as collateral.

=== Title III—Joint Commission on the Coinage (sections 301 to 304) ===
Sections 301 to 303 establish a Joint Commission on the Coinage in the Executive Branch, chaired by the Treasury Secretary. Its membership was to include the Commerce Secretary, Budget Director, Mint Director, six members of the House, six of the Senate, and eight members of the public, appointed by the president. If a member of the commission left the position that qualified him for membership, he would leave the commission as well. The members of the public were not to have any financial conflicts of interest.

The Joint Commission was tasked to report on the implementation of the Coinage Act of 1965, and make recommendations from time to time to the president, the Treasury Secretary, and Congress. The matters within its remit were to include technological advances, the need of the economy for coins, whether the U.S. should continue to maintain the price of silver, and whether the silver dollar should again be minted. Section 304 appropriated such money as might be needed to carry out the Coinage Act.

== Aftermath ==
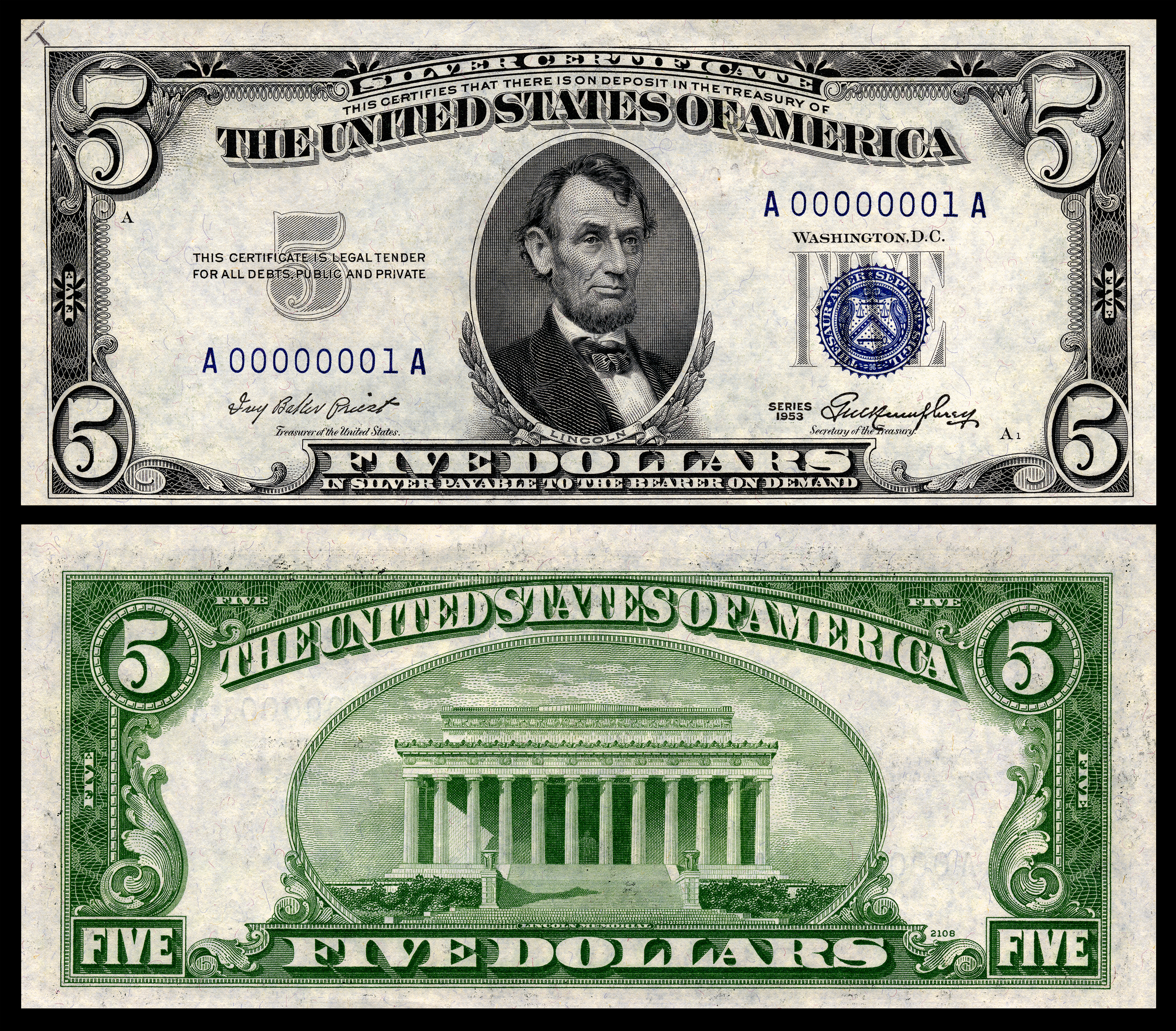
A $5 silver certificate, no longer redeemable at the Treasury

The Mint began to strike the first of the 1965-dated clad coins, quarters, on August 23 of that year, making them the first U.S. coins to bear that date. By November 1965, with the Christmas shopping season beginning, the Fed had only 15 million of the old silver quarters in reserve. That month, though, the Mint released over 230 million of the new clad quarters, and stated that an equal number would be issued every month. This figure quadrupled the previous record monthly production. The new dime and half dollar were released in early 1966, a time when flowback to the Fed increased for all denominations being struck except the half dollar. That denomination failed to return to circulation, as they continued to be withdrawn. The Mint continued to strike 1964-dated silver pieces under the authority of the Coinage Act until 1966, when Secretary Fowler announced, "the coin shortage is over". In July 1966, the Treasury announced that coins struck after August 1, 1966, would bear the date of minting.

Silver inventories at the Treasury continued to drop through 1966 as the government attempted to maintain the $1.2929 price of silver. The Joint Commission on the Coinage, authorized by the Coinage Act, held its first meeting in May 1967 to recommend how to deal with the situation. At its recommendation, the Treasury discontinued sales it deemed speculative, and to foreign buyers, attempting to supply only U.S. industry at that price, and resulting in a two-tier price system for silver. It also invoked its authority under the Coinage Act to prohibit the melting or export of silver coins. In June 1967, it obtained legislation making silver certificates no longer exchangeable for bullion effective after a year. After the Joint Commission's second meeting, in July 1967, the Treasury announced that it would no longer attempt to maintain the $1.2929 price as it could keep the nation supplied even if all the remaining silver coins vanished from circulation, as they soon did. By the time silver certificate redemptions ended on June 24, 1968, the price of silver had risen to $2.56 per ounce. Although the Joint Commission in December 1968 voted to recommend making the prohibitions on melting or exporting silver coin permanent, it reconsidered and in March 1969, the bans were lifted. In November 1969, the government left the silver market, making its final sales of bullion to the Franklin Mint. Mint marks returned to the coinage in 1968. The new coins came to be pejoratively known as "Johnson sandwiches" for their copper interiors.

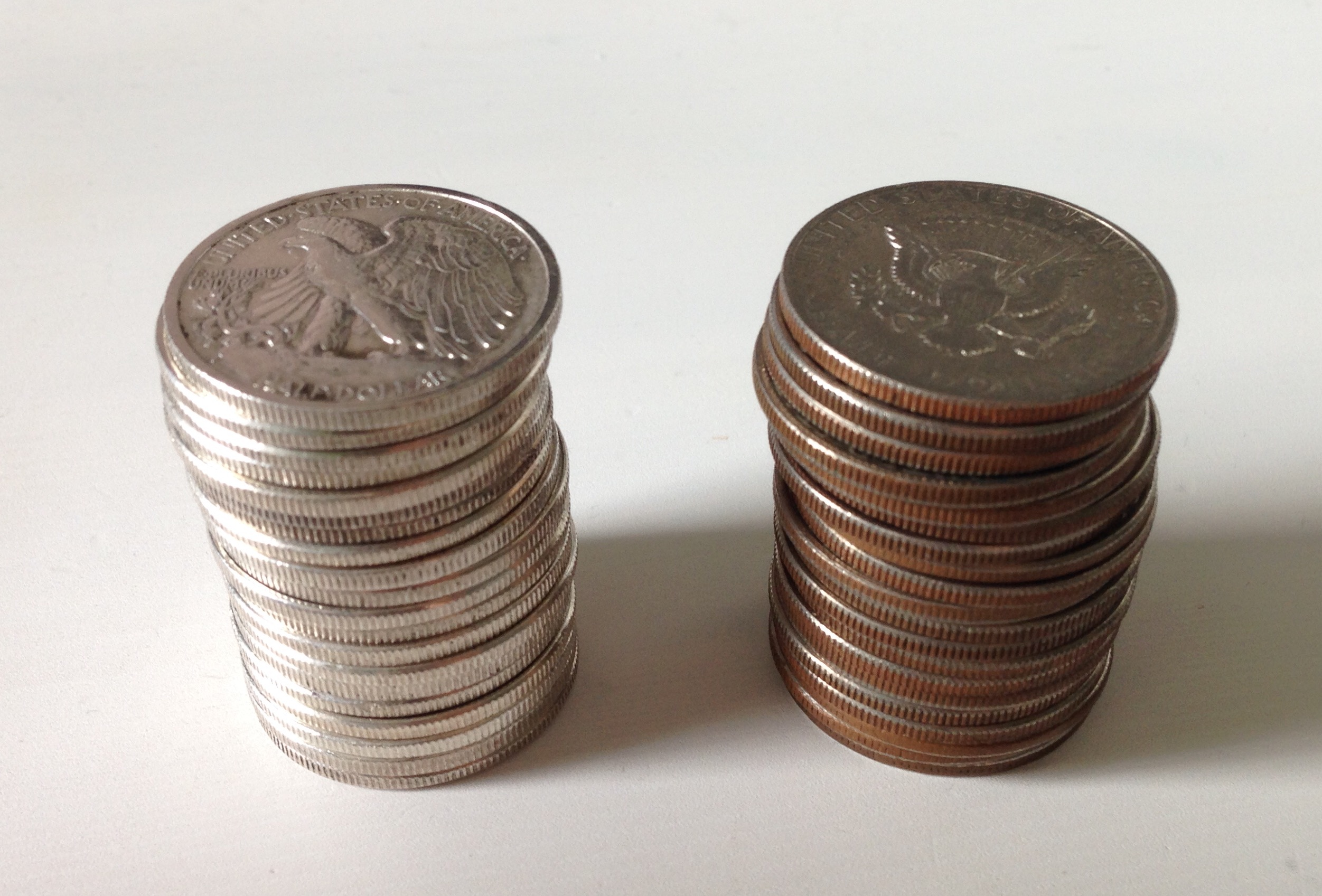
The elimination of silver from circulating half dollars as of December 31, 1970 can be seen in detail with these stacks of Walking Liberty and post-1970 Kennedy half dollar coins; the clad coins on the right are instantly recognisable as their copper cores are visible on the edges.

With the end of the Coinage Act's five-year prohibition on the striking of silver dollars approaching in 1969 and 1970, many in Congress wanted a new silver dollar, bearing the image of the recently deceased president, Dwight D. Eisenhower. The melt value of the new part-silver half dollars had approached their face value, and in 1969, the Joint Commission recommended the elimination of that metal from the halves. The battle over whether to have silver in the proposed dollar proved contentious, and it was not until December 31, 1970, that President Richard Nixon signed legislation for a circulating half dollar and Eisenhower dollar, both silverless, with part-silver collector's versions of the dollar also authorized. The same bill authorized the sale of the remaining old silver dollars in government inventories, many from the Carson City Mint. The base metal dollar and half dollar were struck beginning in 1971. Both failed to circulate: the "Ike dollar" because of its size, and the half dollar because its place in commerce had been lost during its long absence.

== See also ==
- Coinage Act of 1834
- Coinage Act of 1849
- Coinage Act of 1853
- Coinage Act of 1857
- Coinage Act of 1864
- Coinage Act of 1873

== Sources ==
- American Institute for Economic Research (June 14, 1965). "The President's Coinage Message" (PDF). Archived from the original (PDF) on April 17, 2016.
- Burdette, Roger W. (2008). A Guide Book of Peace Dollars. Atlanta GA: Whitman Publishing. ISBN 978-0-7948-2669-7.
- Coin World Almanac (1st ed.). Sidney OH: Amos Press. 1975.
- Coin World Almanac (8th ed.). Sidney OH: Amos Press. 2011. ISBN 978-0-944945-60-5.
- Elliott, Gary (1994). Senator Alan Bible and the Politics of the New West. Reno NV: University of Nevada Press. ISBN 978-0-87417-240-9.
- Federal Reserve Bank of New York (August 1967). "Recent Changes in United States Silver Policy" (PDF). Monthly Review. Federal Reserve Bank of New York: 151–156.
- Friedman, Milton (December 1990). "The Crime of 1873". Journal of Political Economy. 98 (6). The University of Chicago Press: 1159–1194. doi:10.1086/261730. JSTOR 2937754. S2CID 153940661.
- Lange, David W. (2006). History of the United States Mint and its Coinage. Atlanta GA: Whitman Publishing. ISBN 978-0-7948-1972-9.
- Lange, David W. (September 2015). "U.S. Coinage Dated 1965, Part I". The Numismatist. American Numismatic Association: 17–18.
- Taxay, Don (1983). The U.S. Mint and Coinage (reprint of 1966 ed.). New York NY: Sanford J. Durst Numismatic Publications. ISBN 978-0-915262-68-7.
- United States House of Representatives Committee on Appropriations (May 24, 1965). Special Hearing on Silver Dollars (subcommittee hearing). Washington DC: United States Government Printing Office.
- United States House of Representatives Committee on Banking and Currency (June 11, 1965). Coinage Act of 1965 (report). Washington DC: United States Government Printing Office.
- United States House of Representatives Committee on Government Operations (July 2, 1964). Coin Shortage. Washington DC: United States Government Printing Office.
- United States House of Representatives Committee on Government Operations (March 22, 1965). Coin Shortage, Part 1. Washington DC: United States Government Printing Office.
- United States House of Representatives Committee on Government Operations (March 22, 1965). Coin Shortage, Part 2. Washington DC: United States Government Printing Office.
- United States Senate Committee on Banking and Currency (June 9, 1965). Coinage Act of 1965 (hearings). Washington DC: United States Government Printing Office.
- United States Senate Committee on Banking and Currency (June 11, 1965). Coinage Act of 1965 (report). Washington DC: United States Government Printing Office.
