= Coinage Act 1971 =

Act of the Parliament of the United Kingdom

Coinage Act 1971 (Note: Section 14(1).)
- Act of Parliament
- Parliament of the United Kingdom
- Long title: An Act to consolidate, so far as they are part of the law of the United Kingdom, the Coinage Acts 1870 to 1946 and certain other enactments relating to coinage, with amendments to give effect to recommendations of the Law Commission and the Scottish Law Commission.
- Citation: 1971 c. 24
- Territorial extent: England and Wales; Scotland; Northern Ireland; (Note: Section 14(3).)

Dates
- Royal assent: 12 May 1971
- Commencement: 1 September 1971 (Note: Section 14(2). The Decimal Currency (End of Transitional Period) Order 1971.)
Other legislation
Amends	See § Repealed enactments
Repeals/revokes	See § Repealed enactments
Amended by	Government Trading Funds Act 1973; Forgery and Counterfeiting Act 1981; Statute Law (Repeals) Act 1989; Secretaries of State for Children, Schools and Families, for Innovation, Universities and Skills and for Business, Enterprise and Regulatory Reform Order 2007; Secretary of State for Business, Innovation and Skills Order 2009; Coinage (Measurement) Act 2011; Secretaries of State for Business, Energy and Industrial Strategy, for International Trade and for Exiting the European Union and the Transfer of Functions (Education and Skills) Order 2016; Secretaries of State for Energy Security and Net Zero, for Science, Innovation and Technology, for Business and Trade, and for Culture, Media and Sport and the Transfer of Functions (National Security and Investment Act 2021 etc) Order 2023
Relates to	Decimal Currency Act 1969

Status: Amended

Text of statute as originally enacted

Revised text of statute as amended

Text of the Coinage Act 1971 as in force today (including any amendments) within the United Kingdom, from legislation.gov.uk.

The Coinage Act 1971 (c. 24) is an act of the Parliament of the United Kingdom which consolidated prior coinage-related enactments relating to the country's coinage. Among its provisions, which Royal Mint coins (but not banknotes) are legal tender was redefined, and confirms that the Chancellor of the Exchequer is the Master of the Mint. It received royal assent on 12 May 1971.

== Provisions ==
=== Repealed enactments ===
Section 13 of the act repealed 8 enactments, listed in schedule 3 to the act.

Citation	Short title	Description	Extent of repeal
33 & 34 Vict. c. 10.	Coinage Act 1870	The Coinage Act 1870.	The whole act.
54 & 55 Vict. c. 72.	Coinage Act 1891	The Coinage Act 1891.	The whole act.
10 & 11 Geo. 5. c. 3.	Coinage Act 1920	The Coinage Act 1920.	The whole act.
15 & 16 Geo. 5. c. 29.	Gold Standard Act 1925	The Gold Standard Act 1925.	In section 1, subsection (1) and, in subsection (2), the words " So long as the preceding subsection remains in force ".
21 & 22 Geo. 5. c. 46.	Gold Standard (Amendment) Act 1931	The Gold Standard (Amendment) Act 1931.	In section 1(1) the words " notwithstanding that subsection (1) of the said section remains in force ".
9 & 10 Geo. 6. c. 74.	Coinage Act 1946	The Coinage Act 1946.	The whole act.
1967 c. 47.	Decimal Currency Act 1967	The Decimal Currency Act 1967.	Section 2.
1967 c. 47.	Decimal Currency Act 1967	The Decimal Currency Act 1967.	Section 3.
1967 c. 47.	Decimal Currency Act 1967	The Decimal Currency Act 1967.	Schedule 1.
1967 c. 47.	Decimal Currency Act 1967	The Decimal Currency Act 1967.	Schedule 2.
1969 c. 19.	Decimal Currency Act 1969	The Decimal Currency Act 1969.	Section 1.
1969 c. 19.	Decimal Currency Act 1969	The Decimal Currency Act 1969.	Section 14.
1969 c. 19.	Decimal Currency Act 1969	The Decimal Currency Act 1969.	Section 15.
1969 c. 19.	Decimal Currency Act 1969	The Decimal Currency Act 1969.	Section 16(2).
1969 c. 19.	Decimal Currency Act 1969	The Decimal Currency Act 1969.	Schedule 3.

=== Short title, commencement and extent ===
Section 14(1) of the act provided that the act may be cited as the Coinage Act 1971.

Section 14(2) of the act provided that the act would extend to Northern Ireland.

Section 14(3) of the act provided that the act would come into force at the end of the transitional period defined by section 16(1) of the Decimal Currency Act 1969. The Decimal Currency (End of Transitional Period) Order 1971 (SI 1971 No. 1123) defined that the transition period would end with 31 August 1971.

== See also ==
- Legal tender
- Royal Mint
