= Coinage Act of 1864 =

1864 U.S. federal legislation regulating one- and two-cent coins

- Long title: An Act to amend an Act entitled "An Act to establish a Mint of the United States, and for regulating the Coins of the United States."
- Enacted by: the 38th United States Congress
- Effective: April 22, 1864

Citations
- Statutes at Large: 13 Stat. 54

Codification
- Acts amended: Coinage Act of 1792

Legislative history
- Signed into law by President Abraham Lincoln on April 22, 1864

The Coinage Act of 1864 was a United States federal law passed on April 22, 1864, which changed the composition of the one-cent coin and authorized the minting of the two-cent coin. The law also made it illegal to privately mint one and two cent coins for circulation, thus effectively ending the production of Civil War tokens.

The Director of the U.S. Mint developed the designs for these coins for final approval of the Secretary of the Treasury. As a result of this law, the phrase "In God We Trust" first appeared, on the 1864 two-cent coin. An Act of Congress, passed on March 3, 1865, allowed the Mint Director, with the Secretary's approval, to place the phrase on all gold and silver coins that "shall admit the inscription thereon." In 1956, "In God We Trust" replaced "E Pluribus Unum" as the national motto. Beginning in 1957 currency was also printed with the motto.

== See also ==
- Coinage Act of 1792
- Coinage Act of 1834
- Coinage Act of 1849
- Coinage Act of 1853
- Coinage Act of 1857
- Coinage Act of 1873
- Coinage Act of 1965
