= Coinage Act of 1849 =

1849 United States legislation

- Long title: An Act to authorize the Coinage of Gold Dollars and Double Eagles
- Nicknames: Gold Coinage Act
- Enacted by: the 30th United States Congress

Citations
- Public law: 30-108
- Statutes at Large: 9 Stat. 397, Chap. CIX

Legislative history
- Introduced in the House as H.R. 746 by James Iver McKay (D–NC) on January 25, 1849; Committee consideration by United States House Committee on Ways and Means; Passed the House on February 20, 1849; Passed the Senate on March 3, 1849 with amendment; House agreed to Senate amendment on March 3, 1849 (passed); Signed into law by President James K. Polk on March 3, 1849

The Coinage Act of 1849 was an Act of the United States Congress passed during the California Gold Rush authorizing the Mint to produce two new gold coins in response to the increased gold supply: the small gold dollar and the large double eagle worth twenty dollars. The Act also defined permissible variances in gold coinage.

== Legislation ==
House Bill No. 746 was introduced by James Iver McKay on January 25, 1849. On February 20, 1849, the bill was reported by the United States House Committee on Ways and Means and taken up by the House for debate. The bill passed the House the same day and moved to consideration in the Senate. On March 3, 1849, the bill was reported by the United States Senate Committee on Finance and taken up by the Senate for debate. The bill passed the Senate the same day with amendments and was sent back to the House for consideration. The House agreed to the amendments and the bill was signed into law by President James K. Polk.

== See also ==
- Coinage Act of 1792
- Coinage Act of 1834
- Coinage Act of 1853
- Coinage Act of 1857
- Coinage Act of 1864
- Coinage Act of 1873
- Coinage Act of 1965
