= Coinage Act of 1853 =

1853 United States legislation

- Long title: An Act Amendatory of existing Laws relative to the Half Dollar, Quarter Dollar, Dime, and Half Dime
- Nicknames: Mint Act of 1853
- Enacted by: the 32nd United States Congress
- Effective: June 2, 1853

Citations
- Statutes at Large: 10 Stat. 160, Chap. LXXIX

Legislative history
- Passed the Senate on March 30, 1852; Passed the House on February 15, 1853; Signed into law by President Millard Fillmore on February 21, 1853

The Coinage Act of 1853, 10 Stat. 160, was a piece of legislation passed by the United States Congress which lowered the silver content of the silver half dime, dime, quarter dollar, and half dollar, and authorized a three dollar gold piece. Although intending to stabilize the country's silver shortage, it, in effect, pushed the United States closer to abandoning bimetallism entirely and adopting the gold standard.

Smaller silver denominations in the United States were disappearing as the bullion value of silver far exceeded the face value of U.S. silver coinage. In response, Congress debated a bill which would overvalue most forms of silver coinage and authorize the U.S. Mint to purchase bullion for the new coins. The legislation lowered the silver content of most silver coins by seven percent and was signed into law on February 21, 1853.

The 1853 act increased the circulation of small coinage, ending the United States' silver shortage crisis, and provided an adequate supply of silver coinage for the first time in the nation's history. However, by the time of the outbreak of the Civil War, most metallic coinage became hoarded and the country largely switched to Greenbacks. It would be in 1873 when the debate between silver and gold was finally resolved, with all pretenses of bimetallism replaced in favor of the gold standard.

== Background ==
Since 1792, both silver and gold were legal tender in the United States and citizens could deposit either of the metals in bullion form to the U.S. Mint, which would then give the depositor gold or silver coins based on a legally defined weight ratio of gold and silver, respectively, to dollars. This bimetallic standard was prone to instability, as the value of gold and silver bullion could float on the world market, making U.S. gold and silver coins either over-valued or under-valued depending on the circumstances. This resulted in most U.S. gold and silver being exported to be sold as bullion and most coinage circulated in the country was foreign in origin.

President Jackson intended to increase the circulation of both gold and silver by slightly overvaluing gold in 1834, matching 16 ounces of silver in value to an ounce of gold. The 1834 Coinage Act was initially successful, as the Mint ratio of 16:1 remained fortuitously close to the world price ratio of gold to silver, limiting the advantage speculators would get from melting down silver coinage and selling it as bullion overseas while incentivizing depositors to turn their gold bullion into coins. The United States experienced a net in-flow of gold and silver throughout the early 1840s, and small silver coinage became the major medium of exchange in smaller business transactions.

== Coin shortage ==
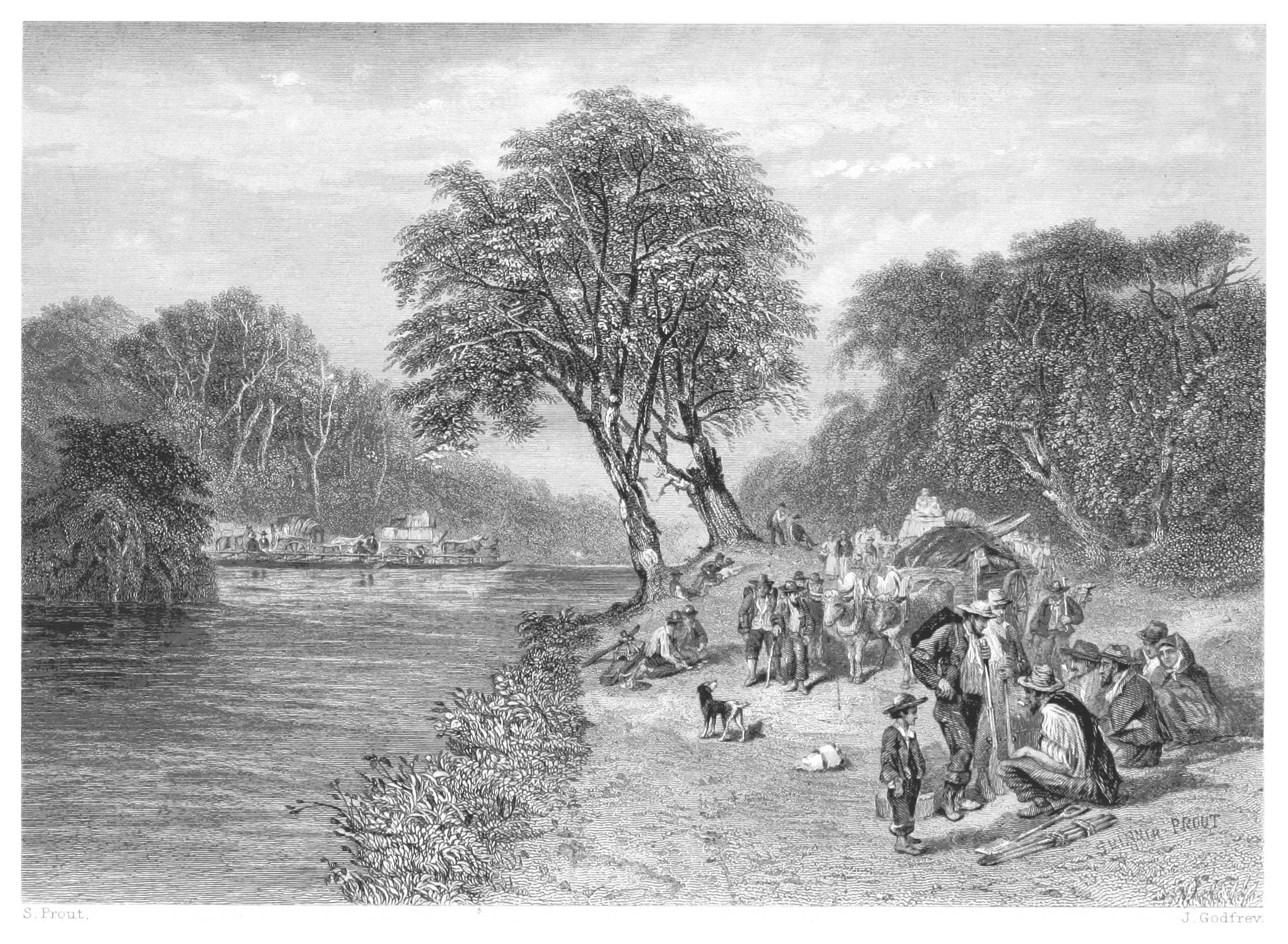
Depiction of Australian gold diggers

However, by 1847, the world ratio of silver ounces to gold had declined to 15.66:1, setting on a collision course with the Mint's legal ratio. In 1849, this ratio was worsened dramatically with the onset of the California Gold Rush and the discovery of new gold deposits in Australia in 1851. These new gold discoveries more than quadrupled annual gold production from an average of 36 million dollars in the 1840s to 155 million dollars by 1853.

As gold flooded the monetary markets of the world, its commodity price declined due to its higher supply. This, in turn, caused the price of silver relative to gold to skyrocket. American silver became a premium. With the bullion value of silver far exceeding the face value of U.S. silver coins, melting became rampant as speculators could sell off their silver coins as bullion for its more profitable world market value. Small silver coinage, which retail businesses and consumers relied upon for minor transactions, soon began to disappear, forcing some businesses to pay premium values just to obtain change.

== Inception ==
Throughout the early 1850s, Congress debated numerous proposals which would debase silver coinage to overvalue silver and stem the out-flow of the metal from the United States. But there was significant resistance among some congressmen to any attempt to tamper with the value of money, despite the fact that Congress in 1834 had already established a precedent by effectively debasing gold coinage to improve its circulation.

=== Intentions of the bill's authors ===
By December 1851, the Treasury Department submitted a report which indicated that the disappearance of U.S. currency had reached a critical point, and put forth recommendations to reduce the silver content in all forms of silver coinage. Following the recommendations of the Treasury, a bill passed through the Senate Finance Committee in March 1852 which would reduce nearly all U.S. fractions by around 7 percent, but—contrary to the Treasury's report—left the silver dollar unchanged. This was to make explicit, in the words of the Committee chair Robert M. T. Hunter, that the committee had apprehension towards tampering with what they viewed as money's inherent value, and only intended the bill to be a temporary measure to restore some circulation of silver to the country. The bill would not be a drastic change, but would only mandate the smallest deviation possible necessary to "accomplish the object of retaining a specie currency for small transactions". Still contending with the objections of some senators, Senate Bill No. 271 passed the Senate and moved to consideration in the House of Representatives in December 1852.

=== Passage through the House ===
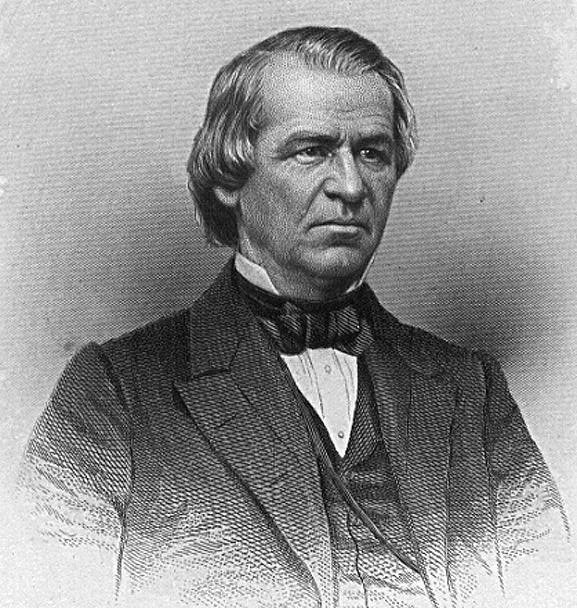
Future president Andrew Johnson from Tennessee was one of several congressmen fiercely opposed to the bill

Senate No. 271 ran into numerous obstacles in the House. Then Tennessee representative and future president Andrew Johnson was one of many vociferous opponents of the proposal to debase silver, calling the idea of Congress fixing the value of currency an exercise in the "merest quackery--the veriest charlatanism". Additionally, the bill was encumbered by numerous House amendments led by a cadre of congressmen who wished to see the United States switch entirely to the gold standard. The most important amendment, authored by Representative Cyrus Dunham, would have removed legal tender status from any new silver coins in private transactions, so as to eliminate silver as a medium of exchange. Dunham's amended version of the bill ran into heavy opposition, however, both from proponents of bimetallism that wanted to see the Senate No. 271 pass unaltered and those congressmen fiercely opposed to any change to the status quo. Finally, on February 15, 1853, the bill was passed through the House in exactly the same form that it left the Senate months earlier, and was signed into law six days later.

== Provisions ==
The Coinage Act of February 21, 1853 lowered the weight (i.e. the silver content) of all silver coinage except for the silver dollar by approximately 7 percent. The Act also fixed the legal tender status of silver to transactions worth a maximum of five dollars. It also authorized the U.S. Mint to purchase silver bullion using the Mint's bullion fund to create the new coins, and only sell the silver coins to the public in exchange for gold. Finally, the Act forbade private depositors from having their bullion struck into half dime, dime, quarter dollar, and half dollar denominations.

In essence, the Act turned silver into a fiduciary currency, transforming the value of silver coins from something goods and services were sold for into a medium by which goods and services were exchanged.

The silver dollar, which was left untouched by the alteration, has been theorized as the Senate Finance Committee's way of signaling that Congress still held to a de jure bimetallic standard even as the Act eroded against traditional conceptions of silver as a currency.

== Design of new coins ==
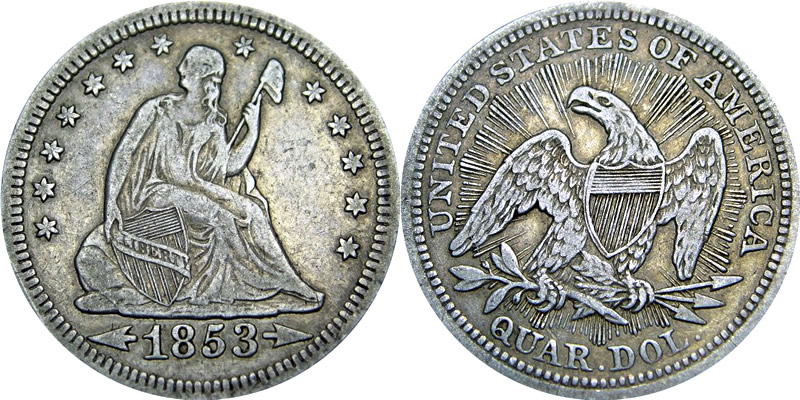
1853 Seated Liberty silver quarter, with its distinct arrows and rays.

Mint officials decided that the new, lower-weight coins should have distinct markings to distinguish them from earlier, full-weight coins. But the necessity of minting as many of the new coins as quickly as possible, to meet the demand of the silver coin shortage, led officials to decide upon simply stamping arrows on either side of the date on the coin and adding a halo of rays on the reverse side of the quarter and half-dollar. Even this caused issues, as the rays complicated and slowed down die production to an unacceptable degree. The rays were removed from the quarter and half-dollar before the end of 1853, although the arrows were kept on new denominations for several more years.

== Aftermath ==
Controversy arose due to Mint officials' maladministration of the law. The Act only allowed the Mint to purchase silver bullion from the Mint's bullion fund to create the new coins. However, Mint Director James Ross Snowden purchased silver bullion from private owners using the new, under-weight silver coins. Even when the market price of silver bullion had fallen, Snowden continued this practice and effectively allowed for free coinage of silver coins as the Act had neglected to set a ceiling limit on the amount of bullion the Mint could purchase. As the silver coins had a legal tender limit of $5, a glut arose of the lightweight silver coins on the market in the late 1850s. Treasury Secretary James Guthrie briefly suspended the coinage of quarters and half dollars as a result of the surplus, but never investigated the Mint policy responsible for creating the oversupply. The nation's silver redundancy lasted until 1862, when the pinch of the Civil War caused coins to disappear from circulation.

Ultimately, the Act achieved what it set out to do and cured the nation's silver shortage. By reducing silver, small coinage reached a level where it could once again circulate in private transactions. The net outflow of silver slowed as the new coins were no longer worth their weight in silver, and were worth more for their face value within the United States than as bullion abroad.

The Act was the beginning of an economic debate between gold and silver which lasted until the late 19th century, but the fundamental discussion about the role of fiduciary currency in the United States would only truly be resolved in 1970 when the U.S. dollar was removed from its peg to the gold standard.

== See also ==
- Coinage Act of 1792
- Coinage Act of 1834
- Coinage Act of 1849
- Coinage Act of 1857
- Coinage Act of 1864
- Coinage Act of 1873
- Coinage Act of 1965
- Three dollar piece
