= Coinage Act of 1834 =

Act passed by the United States Congress on June 28, 1834

- Long title: An Act concerning the gold coins of the United States, and for other purposes
- Enacted by: the 23rd United States Congress
- Effective: July 31, 1834

Citations
- Statutes at Large: 4 Stat. 699

Legislative history
- Passed the House on June 21, 1834; Passed the Senate on June 28, 1834; Signed into law by President Andrew Jackson on June 28, 1834

The Coinage Act of 1834 was passed by the United States Congress on June 28, 1834. It raised the silver-to-gold weight ratio from its 1792 level of 15:1 (established by the Coinage Act of 1792) to 16:1 thus setting the mint price for silver at a level below its international market price.

The Act redefined the U.S. Eagle coin (ten U.S. Dollars) as containing 232 grains of fine gold, compared to 247.5 grains in the prior Act. This fixed the official basis of the dollar as $20.67 per troy ounce. (Note: 480 grains per troy ounce; $10 × (480 grains/troy oz) / 232 grains = $20.69/troy oz) This standard prevailed until 1934, when the official price rose to $35 as a consequence of the Great Depression.

The pure silver content of the silver dollar was left unchanged at 371.25 grains.

== Historical context ==
On June 28, 1834, the Coinage Act of 1834 was signed by Andrew Jackson. It defined the coin weights and allowed the Treasury Department to pay five days after deposit at the mint the full amount of the gold. This sped up the process of getting minted coins for gold. The coinage legislation of 1834 was passed during a contentious political battle between President Andrew Jackson and a contingent of elected officials and bureaucrats led by Nicholas Biddle and Senators John C. Calhoun, Henry Clay and Daniel Webster over the fate of the United States Bank. Biddle, the Bank's president, believed that it served to facilitate the exchange of goods and payments by providing a national currency; however, Jackson feared that an institution as large as the U.S. national bank would be manipulated by powerful financiers to exploit the nation's volatile financial system. Furthermore, he argued that the Constitution did not give Congress the power to charter a corporation which could operate outside the District of Columbia . Therefore, in the summer of 1832, he vetoed a bill that sought to renew the corporate charter for the Bank placing the heated debate over the fate of the national bank squarely in the political spotlight during his re-election campaign. After handily winning re-election, Jackson appointed his Attorney General, Roger B. Taney, as Secretary of the Treasury in 1833. Taney sympathized with Jackson's hostility towards the national bank and mandated that all federal deposits be withdrawn from BUS as quickly as possible severely curtailing the amount of loans the Bank could issue thereby precipitating a national credit shortage.

When Congress convened in December 1833 (known as the “Panic Session”), the credit shortage had managed to intensify the already bitter dispute over the fate of the Bank. While the president's opponents controlled the Senate, his supporters in the House of Representatives managed to push his agenda in the form of coinage legislation that sought to undermine the circulation of U.S. Banknotes in favor of gold currency. The proposed bill was intended to devalue the overvalued silver (revalue the undervalued gold) from which the bank notes derived their monetary worth. After months of drafting and revision, The Coinage Act of 1834 was passed in the House by a vote of 145 to 36 and the Senate passed its version of the bill soon after.

== Economic and historical significance ==
In the first half of the nineteenth century, U.S. money was circulated in both metallic and paper currency. As established by the Coinage Act of 1792, silver coins were authorized in denominations of $0.05, $0.10, $0.25, $0.50 and $1.00. After the Coinage Act of 1834, silver (which was previously overvalued with respect to gold) became significantly undervalued and was exported to European markets where it was traded at a higher price. This led to its near disappearance from circulation after 1834. Despite the attempts by Jackson, Taney and members of Congress to supplant paper currency in favor of “hard-money,” there were over a thousand banks issuing their own notes in small denominations (between $0.01 and $2.50).

== See also ==
- Coinage Act of 1792
- Coinage Act of 1849
- Coinage Act of 1853
- Coinage Act of 1857
- Coinage Act of 1864
- Coinage Act of 1873
- Coinage Act of 1965
